

172001–172100 

|-bgcolor=#d6d6d6
| 172001 ||  || — || October 18, 2001 || Socorro || LINEAR || LIX || align=right | 6.6 km || 
|-id=002 bgcolor=#d6d6d6
| 172002 ||  || — || October 16, 2001 || Socorro || LINEAR || EOS || align=right | 3.9 km || 
|-id=003 bgcolor=#d6d6d6
| 172003 ||  || — || October 16, 2001 || Socorro || LINEAR || — || align=right | 5.6 km || 
|-id=004 bgcolor=#d6d6d6
| 172004 ||  || — || October 17, 2001 || Socorro || LINEAR || EOS || align=right | 3.7 km || 
|-id=005 bgcolor=#d6d6d6
| 172005 ||  || — || October 17, 2001 || Socorro || LINEAR || HYG || align=right | 3.9 km || 
|-id=006 bgcolor=#d6d6d6
| 172006 ||  || — || October 17, 2001 || Socorro || LINEAR || — || align=right | 5.0 km || 
|-id=007 bgcolor=#d6d6d6
| 172007 ||  || — || October 17, 2001 || Socorro || LINEAR || — || align=right | 8.3 km || 
|-id=008 bgcolor=#d6d6d6
| 172008 ||  || — || October 17, 2001 || Socorro || LINEAR || EOS || align=right | 3.6 km || 
|-id=009 bgcolor=#d6d6d6
| 172009 ||  || — || October 17, 2001 || Socorro || LINEAR || — || align=right | 5.4 km || 
|-id=010 bgcolor=#d6d6d6
| 172010 ||  || — || October 17, 2001 || Socorro || LINEAR || EOS || align=right | 2.5 km || 
|-id=011 bgcolor=#d6d6d6
| 172011 ||  || — || October 20, 2001 || Socorro || LINEAR || KOR || align=right | 3.2 km || 
|-id=012 bgcolor=#d6d6d6
| 172012 ||  || — || October 20, 2001 || Socorro || LINEAR || EOS || align=right | 3.0 km || 
|-id=013 bgcolor=#d6d6d6
| 172013 ||  || — || October 20, 2001 || Socorro || LINEAR || EOS || align=right | 3.6 km || 
|-id=014 bgcolor=#d6d6d6
| 172014 ||  || — || October 20, 2001 || Socorro || LINEAR || — || align=right | 3.1 km || 
|-id=015 bgcolor=#d6d6d6
| 172015 ||  || — || October 20, 2001 || Socorro || LINEAR || — || align=right | 3.7 km || 
|-id=016 bgcolor=#d6d6d6
| 172016 ||  || — || October 21, 2001 || Socorro || LINEAR || — || align=right | 4.8 km || 
|-id=017 bgcolor=#d6d6d6
| 172017 ||  || — || October 22, 2001 || Palomar || NEAT || THB || align=right | 7.2 km || 
|-id=018 bgcolor=#d6d6d6
| 172018 ||  || — || October 23, 2001 || Socorro || LINEAR || — || align=right | 5.3 km || 
|-id=019 bgcolor=#d6d6d6
| 172019 ||  || — || October 17, 2001 || Socorro || LINEAR || VER || align=right | 3.9 km || 
|-id=020 bgcolor=#d6d6d6
| 172020 ||  || — || October 17, 2001 || Palomar || NEAT || EOS || align=right | 3.3 km || 
|-id=021 bgcolor=#d6d6d6
| 172021 ||  || — || October 19, 2001 || Palomar || NEAT || — || align=right | 6.9 km || 
|-id=022 bgcolor=#d6d6d6
| 172022 ||  || — || October 20, 2001 || Haleakala || NEAT || — || align=right | 5.4 km || 
|-id=023 bgcolor=#d6d6d6
| 172023 ||  || — || October 21, 2001 || Socorro || LINEAR || — || align=right | 4.5 km || 
|-id=024 bgcolor=#d6d6d6
| 172024 ||  || — || October 23, 2001 || Socorro || LINEAR || THM || align=right | 6.0 km || 
|-id=025 bgcolor=#d6d6d6
| 172025 ||  || — || October 23, 2001 || Socorro || LINEAR || — || align=right | 5.2 km || 
|-id=026 bgcolor=#d6d6d6
| 172026 ||  || — || November 6, 2001 || Socorro || LINEAR || — || align=right | 6.1 km || 
|-id=027 bgcolor=#d6d6d6
| 172027 ||  || — || November 10, 2001 || Socorro || LINEAR || — || align=right | 5.5 km || 
|-id=028 bgcolor=#d6d6d6
| 172028 ||  || — || November 9, 2001 || Socorro || LINEAR || — || align=right | 4.1 km || 
|-id=029 bgcolor=#d6d6d6
| 172029 ||  || — || November 9, 2001 || Socorro || LINEAR || — || align=right | 6.3 km || 
|-id=030 bgcolor=#d6d6d6
| 172030 ||  || — || November 15, 2001 || Socorro || LINEAR || URS || align=right | 5.9 km || 
|-id=031 bgcolor=#d6d6d6
| 172031 ||  || — || November 12, 2001 || Socorro || LINEAR || — || align=right | 4.9 km || 
|-id=032 bgcolor=#d6d6d6
| 172032 ||  || — || November 11, 2001 || Socorro || LINEAR || — || align=right | 5.2 km || 
|-id=033 bgcolor=#d6d6d6
| 172033 || 2001 WQ || — || November 16, 2001 || Kitt Peak || Spacewatch || THM || align=right | 5.0 km || 
|-id=034 bgcolor=#FFC2E0
| 172034 ||  || — || November 17, 2001 || Socorro || LINEAR || AMO +1km || align=right data-sort-value="0.63" | 630 m || 
|-id=035 bgcolor=#d6d6d6
| 172035 ||  || — || November 17, 2001 || Socorro || LINEAR || — || align=right | 5.4 km || 
|-id=036 bgcolor=#d6d6d6
| 172036 ||  || — || November 17, 2001 || Socorro || LINEAR || LIX || align=right | 8.5 km || 
|-id=037 bgcolor=#d6d6d6
| 172037 ||  || — || November 17, 2001 || Socorro || LINEAR || — || align=right | 4.4 km || 
|-id=038 bgcolor=#d6d6d6
| 172038 ||  || — || November 19, 2001 || Socorro || LINEAR || — || align=right | 3.3 km || 
|-id=039 bgcolor=#d6d6d6
| 172039 ||  || — || November 19, 2001 || Socorro || LINEAR || — || align=right | 6.3 km || 
|-id=040 bgcolor=#d6d6d6
| 172040 ||  || — || November 20, 2001 || Socorro || LINEAR || HYG || align=right | 4.0 km || 
|-id=041 bgcolor=#d6d6d6
| 172041 ||  || — || November 17, 2001 || Kitt Peak || Spacewatch || — || align=right | 3.3 km || 
|-id=042 bgcolor=#d6d6d6
| 172042 ||  || — || November 18, 2001 || Kitt Peak || Spacewatch || — || align=right | 4.0 km || 
|-id=043 bgcolor=#d6d6d6
| 172043 ||  || — || December 9, 2001 || Socorro || LINEAR || THB || align=right | 6.1 km || 
|-id=044 bgcolor=#d6d6d6
| 172044 ||  || — || December 7, 2001 || Socorro || LINEAR || VER || align=right | 5.9 km || 
|-id=045 bgcolor=#d6d6d6
| 172045 ||  || — || December 9, 2001 || Socorro || LINEAR || — || align=right | 5.8 km || 
|-id=046 bgcolor=#d6d6d6
| 172046 ||  || — || December 10, 2001 || Socorro || LINEAR || TIR || align=right | 6.8 km || 
|-id=047 bgcolor=#d6d6d6
| 172047 ||  || — || December 11, 2001 || Socorro || LINEAR || EUP || align=right | 7.6 km || 
|-id=048 bgcolor=#d6d6d6
| 172048 ||  || — || December 11, 2001 || Socorro || LINEAR || — || align=right | 7.4 km || 
|-id=049 bgcolor=#d6d6d6
| 172049 ||  || — || December 10, 2001 || Socorro || LINEAR || — || align=right | 3.9 km || 
|-id=050 bgcolor=#d6d6d6
| 172050 ||  || — || December 11, 2001 || Socorro || LINEAR || — || align=right | 4.2 km || 
|-id=051 bgcolor=#d6d6d6
| 172051 ||  || — || December 14, 2001 || Socorro || LINEAR || — || align=right | 3.2 km || 
|-id=052 bgcolor=#d6d6d6
| 172052 ||  || — || December 14, 2001 || Socorro || LINEAR || — || align=right | 5.5 km || 
|-id=053 bgcolor=#d6d6d6
| 172053 ||  || — || December 14, 2001 || Socorro || LINEAR || — || align=right | 6.0 km || 
|-id=054 bgcolor=#d6d6d6
| 172054 ||  || — || December 14, 2001 || Socorro || LINEAR || — || align=right | 5.5 km || 
|-id=055 bgcolor=#d6d6d6
| 172055 ||  || — || December 14, 2001 || Socorro || LINEAR || — || align=right | 7.1 km || 
|-id=056 bgcolor=#d6d6d6
| 172056 ||  || — || December 14, 2001 || Socorro || LINEAR || — || align=right | 5.5 km || 
|-id=057 bgcolor=#d6d6d6
| 172057 ||  || — || December 14, 2001 || Socorro || LINEAR || — || align=right | 6.1 km || 
|-id=058 bgcolor=#d6d6d6
| 172058 ||  || — || December 14, 2001 || Bergisch Gladbach || W. Bickel || — || align=right | 4.5 km || 
|-id=059 bgcolor=#d6d6d6
| 172059 ||  || — || December 11, 2001 || Socorro || LINEAR || — || align=right | 6.5 km || 
|-id=060 bgcolor=#d6d6d6
| 172060 ||  || — || December 11, 2001 || Socorro || LINEAR || 7:4 || align=right | 7.2 km || 
|-id=061 bgcolor=#d6d6d6
| 172061 ||  || — || December 15, 2001 || Socorro || LINEAR || EOS || align=right | 3.3 km || 
|-id=062 bgcolor=#d6d6d6
| 172062 ||  || — || December 15, 2001 || Socorro || LINEAR || — || align=right | 4.4 km || 
|-id=063 bgcolor=#d6d6d6
| 172063 ||  || — || December 15, 2001 || Socorro || LINEAR || — || align=right | 3.7 km || 
|-id=064 bgcolor=#d6d6d6
| 172064 ||  || — || December 15, 2001 || Socorro || LINEAR || — || align=right | 5.8 km || 
|-id=065 bgcolor=#d6d6d6
| 172065 ||  || — || December 15, 2001 || Socorro || LINEAR || LIX || align=right | 7.2 km || 
|-id=066 bgcolor=#d6d6d6
| 172066 ||  || — || December 18, 2001 || Socorro || LINEAR || — || align=right | 4.0 km || 
|-id=067 bgcolor=#d6d6d6
| 172067 ||  || — || December 19, 2001 || Kitt Peak || Spacewatch || — || align=right | 5.0 km || 
|-id=068 bgcolor=#fefefe
| 172068 ||  || — || January 11, 2002 || Campo Imperatore || CINEOS || FLO || align=right | 1.1 km || 
|-id=069 bgcolor=#d6d6d6
| 172069 ||  || — || January 9, 2002 || Socorro || LINEAR || ALA || align=right | 6.5 km || 
|-id=070 bgcolor=#d6d6d6
| 172070 ||  || — || January 8, 2002 || Socorro || LINEAR || HYG || align=right | 4.8 km || 
|-id=071 bgcolor=#d6d6d6
| 172071 ||  || — || January 8, 2002 || Socorro || LINEAR || — || align=right | 5.9 km || 
|-id=072 bgcolor=#d6d6d6
| 172072 ||  || — || January 9, 2002 || Socorro || LINEAR || — || align=right | 5.7 km || 
|-id=073 bgcolor=#d6d6d6
| 172073 ||  || — || January 9, 2002 || Socorro || LINEAR || ARM || align=right | 6.1 km || 
|-id=074 bgcolor=#d6d6d6
| 172074 ||  || — || January 8, 2002 || Socorro || LINEAR || THM || align=right | 3.6 km || 
|-id=075 bgcolor=#d6d6d6
| 172075 ||  || — || January 8, 2002 || Socorro || LINEAR || SYL7:4 || align=right | 7.5 km || 
|-id=076 bgcolor=#fefefe
| 172076 ||  || — || January 8, 2002 || Socorro || LINEAR || — || align=right | 1.5 km || 
|-id=077 bgcolor=#fefefe
| 172077 ||  || — || January 12, 2002 || Palomar || NEAT || FLO || align=right data-sort-value="0.99" | 990 m || 
|-id=078 bgcolor=#fefefe
| 172078 ||  || — || January 19, 2002 || Socorro || LINEAR || FLO || align=right | 1.1 km || 
|-id=079 bgcolor=#d6d6d6
| 172079 ||  || — || January 18, 2002 || Anderson Mesa || LONEOS || 7:4 || align=right | 8.3 km || 
|-id=080 bgcolor=#fefefe
| 172080 ||  || — || February 6, 2002 || Socorro || LINEAR || — || align=right | 1.3 km || 
|-id=081 bgcolor=#fefefe
| 172081 ||  || — || February 6, 2002 || Socorro || LINEAR || — || align=right | 1.5 km || 
|-id=082 bgcolor=#fefefe
| 172082 ||  || — || February 7, 2002 || Socorro || LINEAR || — || align=right | 1.1 km || 
|-id=083 bgcolor=#fefefe
| 172083 ||  || — || February 7, 2002 || Socorro || LINEAR || — || align=right | 1.0 km || 
|-id=084 bgcolor=#d6d6d6
| 172084 ||  || — || February 7, 2002 || Socorro || LINEAR || THM || align=right | 4.1 km || 
|-id=085 bgcolor=#fefefe
| 172085 ||  || — || February 7, 2002 || Socorro || LINEAR || — || align=right | 2.1 km || 
|-id=086 bgcolor=#fefefe
| 172086 ||  || — || February 7, 2002 || Socorro || LINEAR || — || align=right | 1.8 km || 
|-id=087 bgcolor=#fefefe
| 172087 ||  || — || February 8, 2002 || Socorro || LINEAR || NYS || align=right | 3.0 km || 
|-id=088 bgcolor=#fefefe
| 172088 ||  || — || February 10, 2002 || Socorro || LINEAR || — || align=right | 1.0 km || 
|-id=089 bgcolor=#fefefe
| 172089 ||  || — || February 11, 2002 || Socorro || LINEAR || — || align=right | 1.0 km || 
|-id=090 bgcolor=#d6d6d6
| 172090 Davidmccomas ||  ||  || February 6, 2002 || Kitt Peak || M. W. Buie || THM || align=right | 3.5 km || 
|-id=091 bgcolor=#fefefe
| 172091 ||  || — || February 11, 2002 || Socorro || LINEAR || FLO || align=right | 1.0 km || 
|-id=092 bgcolor=#fefefe
| 172092 ||  || — || March 9, 2002 || Socorro || LINEAR || NYS || align=right | 1.3 km || 
|-id=093 bgcolor=#fefefe
| 172093 ||  || — || March 9, 2002 || Socorro || LINEAR || — || align=right | 1.2 km || 
|-id=094 bgcolor=#fefefe
| 172094 ||  || — || March 13, 2002 || Socorro || LINEAR || FLO || align=right | 1.0 km || 
|-id=095 bgcolor=#fefefe
| 172095 ||  || — || March 10, 2002 || Haleakala || NEAT || FLO || align=right | 1.00 km || 
|-id=096 bgcolor=#fefefe
| 172096 ||  || — || March 12, 2002 || Socorro || LINEAR || — || align=right | 1.5 km || 
|-id=097 bgcolor=#fefefe
| 172097 ||  || — || March 8, 2002 || Ondřejov || Ondřejov Obs. || — || align=right | 1.00 km || 
|-id=098 bgcolor=#fefefe
| 172098 ||  || — || March 10, 2002 || Anderson Mesa || LONEOS || — || align=right | 1.3 km || 
|-id=099 bgcolor=#fefefe
| 172099 ||  || — || March 12, 2002 || Palomar || NEAT || — || align=right data-sort-value="0.89" | 890 m || 
|-id=100 bgcolor=#fefefe
| 172100 ||  || — || March 16, 2002 || Socorro || LINEAR || — || align=right | 1.3 km || 
|}

172101–172200 

|-bgcolor=#fefefe
| 172101 ||  || — || March 16, 2002 || Socorro || LINEAR || EUT || align=right | 1.2 km || 
|-id=102 bgcolor=#fefefe
| 172102 ||  || — || March 16, 2002 || Haleakala || NEAT || — || align=right | 1.4 km || 
|-id=103 bgcolor=#fefefe
| 172103 ||  || — || March 20, 2002 || Anderson Mesa || LONEOS || — || align=right | 1.6 km || 
|-id=104 bgcolor=#fefefe
| 172104 ||  || — || April 15, 2002 || Desert Eagle || W. K. Y. Yeung || — || align=right | 1.1 km || 
|-id=105 bgcolor=#fefefe
| 172105 ||  || — || April 15, 2002 || Socorro || LINEAR || — || align=right | 1.3 km || 
|-id=106 bgcolor=#fefefe
| 172106 ||  || — || April 13, 2002 || Kitt Peak || Spacewatch || — || align=right | 2.1 km || 
|-id=107 bgcolor=#fefefe
| 172107 ||  || — || April 4, 2002 || Palomar || NEAT || V || align=right | 1.0 km || 
|-id=108 bgcolor=#E9E9E9
| 172108 ||  || — || April 8, 2002 || Kitt Peak || Spacewatch || MAR || align=right | 1.7 km || 
|-id=109 bgcolor=#fefefe
| 172109 ||  || — || April 9, 2002 || Anderson Mesa || LONEOS || NYS || align=right | 3.0 km || 
|-id=110 bgcolor=#fefefe
| 172110 ||  || — || April 10, 2002 || Socorro || LINEAR || — || align=right | 1.2 km || 
|-id=111 bgcolor=#fefefe
| 172111 ||  || — || April 10, 2002 || Socorro || LINEAR || FLO || align=right | 1.2 km || 
|-id=112 bgcolor=#fefefe
| 172112 ||  || — || April 10, 2002 || Socorro || LINEAR || — || align=right | 1.4 km || 
|-id=113 bgcolor=#fefefe
| 172113 ||  || — || April 9, 2002 || Socorro || LINEAR || FLO || align=right | 2.3 km || 
|-id=114 bgcolor=#fefefe
| 172114 ||  || — || April 11, 2002 || Socorro || LINEAR || V || align=right | 1.1 km || 
|-id=115 bgcolor=#fefefe
| 172115 ||  || — || April 10, 2002 || Socorro || LINEAR || FLO || align=right data-sort-value="0.94" | 940 m || 
|-id=116 bgcolor=#fefefe
| 172116 ||  || — || April 11, 2002 || Socorro || LINEAR || V || align=right | 1.1 km || 
|-id=117 bgcolor=#fefefe
| 172117 ||  || — || April 11, 2002 || Socorro || LINEAR || FLO || align=right | 1.3 km || 
|-id=118 bgcolor=#fefefe
| 172118 ||  || — || April 11, 2002 || Socorro || LINEAR || — || align=right | 1.8 km || 
|-id=119 bgcolor=#fefefe
| 172119 ||  || — || April 11, 2002 || Socorro || LINEAR || V || align=right | 1.3 km || 
|-id=120 bgcolor=#fefefe
| 172120 ||  || — || April 12, 2002 || Socorro || LINEAR || — || align=right | 1.2 km || 
|-id=121 bgcolor=#fefefe
| 172121 ||  || — || April 12, 2002 || Socorro || LINEAR || V || align=right | 1.3 km || 
|-id=122 bgcolor=#fefefe
| 172122 ||  || — || April 14, 2002 || Socorro || LINEAR || — || align=right | 1.1 km || 
|-id=123 bgcolor=#fefefe
| 172123 ||  || — || April 9, 2002 || Socorro || LINEAR || — || align=right | 1.2 km || 
|-id=124 bgcolor=#fefefe
| 172124 ||  || — || April 10, 2002 || Socorro || LINEAR || — || align=right | 1.3 km || 
|-id=125 bgcolor=#fefefe
| 172125 ||  || — || April 16, 2002 || Socorro || LINEAR || — || align=right | 1.5 km || 
|-id=126 bgcolor=#fefefe
| 172126 ||  || — || April 18, 2002 || Reedy Creek || J. Broughton || — || align=right | 1.4 km || 
|-id=127 bgcolor=#fefefe
| 172127 ||  || — || April 17, 2002 || Socorro || LINEAR || — || align=right | 1.6 km || 
|-id=128 bgcolor=#fefefe
| 172128 ||  || — || April 16, 2002 || Socorro || LINEAR || V || align=right | 1.1 km || 
|-id=129 bgcolor=#fefefe
| 172129 ||  || — || April 18, 2002 || Palomar || NEAT || FLO || align=right data-sort-value="0.91" | 910 m || 
|-id=130 bgcolor=#fefefe
| 172130 ||  || — || May 8, 2002 || Haleakala || NEAT || — || align=right | 1.7 km || 
|-id=131 bgcolor=#fefefe
| 172131 ||  || — || May 8, 2002 || Socorro || LINEAR || — || align=right | 1.7 km || 
|-id=132 bgcolor=#fefefe
| 172132 ||  || — || May 9, 2002 || Socorro || LINEAR || — || align=right | 1.3 km || 
|-id=133 bgcolor=#fefefe
| 172133 ||  || — || May 10, 2002 || Kitt Peak || Spacewatch || — || align=right | 1.1 km || 
|-id=134 bgcolor=#fefefe
| 172134 ||  || — || May 8, 2002 || Socorro || LINEAR || — || align=right | 1.8 km || 
|-id=135 bgcolor=#fefefe
| 172135 ||  || — || May 9, 2002 || Socorro || LINEAR || — || align=right | 1.3 km || 
|-id=136 bgcolor=#fefefe
| 172136 ||  || — || May 9, 2002 || Socorro || LINEAR || NYS || align=right data-sort-value="0.90" | 900 m || 
|-id=137 bgcolor=#fefefe
| 172137 ||  || — || May 8, 2002 || Socorro || LINEAR || V || align=right | 1.3 km || 
|-id=138 bgcolor=#fefefe
| 172138 ||  || — || May 9, 2002 || Socorro || LINEAR || NYS || align=right | 1.1 km || 
|-id=139 bgcolor=#fefefe
| 172139 ||  || — || May 11, 2002 || Socorro || LINEAR || FLO || align=right | 1.1 km || 
|-id=140 bgcolor=#fefefe
| 172140 ||  || — || May 11, 2002 || Socorro || LINEAR || V || align=right data-sort-value="0.95" | 950 m || 
|-id=141 bgcolor=#fefefe
| 172141 ||  || — || May 11, 2002 || Socorro || LINEAR || V || align=right | 1.5 km || 
|-id=142 bgcolor=#fefefe
| 172142 ||  || — || May 11, 2002 || Socorro || LINEAR || — || align=right | 1.2 km || 
|-id=143 bgcolor=#fefefe
| 172143 ||  || — || May 11, 2002 || Socorro || LINEAR || — || align=right | 1.5 km || 
|-id=144 bgcolor=#fefefe
| 172144 ||  || — || May 9, 2002 || Socorro || LINEAR || — || align=right | 1.2 km || 
|-id=145 bgcolor=#fefefe
| 172145 ||  || — || May 9, 2002 || Palomar || NEAT || — || align=right | 1.8 km || 
|-id=146 bgcolor=#fefefe
| 172146 ||  || — || May 15, 2002 || Palomar || NEAT || — || align=right | 2.1 km || 
|-id=147 bgcolor=#E9E9E9
| 172147 ||  || — || May 16, 2002 || Socorro || LINEAR || EUN || align=right | 3.1 km || 
|-id=148 bgcolor=#fefefe
| 172148 ||  || — || June 4, 2002 || Palomar || NEAT || MAS || align=right | 1.1 km || 
|-id=149 bgcolor=#E9E9E9
| 172149 ||  || — || June 5, 2002 || Socorro || LINEAR || — || align=right | 2.5 km || 
|-id=150 bgcolor=#E9E9E9
| 172150 ||  || — || June 9, 2002 || Socorro || LINEAR || — || align=right | 3.2 km || 
|-id=151 bgcolor=#E9E9E9
| 172151 ||  || — || June 10, 2002 || Socorro || LINEAR || MAR || align=right | 2.2 km || 
|-id=152 bgcolor=#E9E9E9
| 172152 ||  || — || June 12, 2002 || Palomar || NEAT || — || align=right | 2.1 km || 
|-id=153 bgcolor=#E9E9E9
| 172153 ||  || — || July 11, 2002 || Campo Imperatore || CINEOS || — || align=right | 1.6 km || 
|-id=154 bgcolor=#fefefe
| 172154 ||  || — || July 4, 2002 || Palomar || NEAT || V || align=right | 1.3 km || 
|-id=155 bgcolor=#E9E9E9
| 172155 ||  || — || July 9, 2002 || Socorro || LINEAR || — || align=right | 4.4 km || 
|-id=156 bgcolor=#E9E9E9
| 172156 ||  || — || July 9, 2002 || Socorro || LINEAR || — || align=right | 4.9 km || 
|-id=157 bgcolor=#E9E9E9
| 172157 ||  || — || July 9, 2002 || Socorro || LINEAR || — || align=right | 3.4 km || 
|-id=158 bgcolor=#fefefe
| 172158 ||  || — || July 13, 2002 || Palomar || NEAT || — || align=right | 1.6 km || 
|-id=159 bgcolor=#fefefe
| 172159 ||  || — || July 5, 2002 || Socorro || LINEAR || — || align=right | 2.6 km || 
|-id=160 bgcolor=#E9E9E9
| 172160 ||  || — || July 13, 2002 || Socorro || LINEAR || — || align=right | 2.2 km || 
|-id=161 bgcolor=#E9E9E9
| 172161 ||  || — || July 9, 2002 || Socorro || LINEAR || ADE || align=right | 4.6 km || 
|-id=162 bgcolor=#E9E9E9
| 172162 ||  || — || July 9, 2002 || Socorro || LINEAR || — || align=right | 3.4 km || 
|-id=163 bgcolor=#E9E9E9
| 172163 ||  || — || July 14, 2002 || Socorro || LINEAR || — || align=right | 3.0 km || 
|-id=164 bgcolor=#E9E9E9
| 172164 ||  || — || July 14, 2002 || Palomar || NEAT || — || align=right | 1.9 km || 
|-id=165 bgcolor=#E9E9E9
| 172165 ||  || — || July 14, 2002 || Palomar || NEAT || — || align=right | 2.0 km || 
|-id=166 bgcolor=#E9E9E9
| 172166 ||  || — || July 1, 2002 || Lake Tekapo || P. J. Tristram || — || align=right | 2.3 km || 
|-id=167 bgcolor=#E9E9E9
| 172167 ||  || — || July 5, 2002 || Socorro || LINEAR || — || align=right | 1.9 km || 
|-id=168 bgcolor=#E9E9E9
| 172168 ||  || — || July 17, 2002 || Socorro || LINEAR || EUN || align=right | 2.1 km || 
|-id=169 bgcolor=#E9E9E9
| 172169 ||  || — || July 17, 2002 || Socorro || LINEAR || — || align=right | 4.3 km || 
|-id=170 bgcolor=#E9E9E9
| 172170 ||  || — || July 17, 2002 || Socorro || LINEAR || ADE || align=right | 4.7 km || 
|-id=171 bgcolor=#E9E9E9
| 172171 || 2002 PT || — || August 2, 2002 || Campo Imperatore || CINEOS || — || align=right | 2.8 km || 
|-id=172 bgcolor=#fefefe
| 172172 ||  || — || August 6, 2002 || Palomar || NEAT || V || align=right | 1.1 km || 
|-id=173 bgcolor=#fefefe
| 172173 ||  || — || August 6, 2002 || Palomar || NEAT || — || align=right | 1.2 km || 
|-id=174 bgcolor=#E9E9E9
| 172174 ||  || — || August 6, 2002 || Palomar || NEAT || — || align=right | 1.6 km || 
|-id=175 bgcolor=#E9E9E9
| 172175 ||  || — || August 6, 2002 || Palomar || NEAT || — || align=right | 1.8 km || 
|-id=176 bgcolor=#E9E9E9
| 172176 ||  || — || August 4, 2002 || Socorro || LINEAR || EUN || align=right | 1.9 km || 
|-id=177 bgcolor=#E9E9E9
| 172177 ||  || — || August 5, 2002 || Socorro || LINEAR || — || align=right | 2.9 km || 
|-id=178 bgcolor=#E9E9E9
| 172178 ||  || — || August 5, 2002 || Socorro || LINEAR || — || align=right | 4.7 km || 
|-id=179 bgcolor=#FA8072
| 172179 ||  || — || August 10, 2002 || Socorro || LINEAR || H || align=right data-sort-value="0.92" | 920 m || 
|-id=180 bgcolor=#E9E9E9
| 172180 ||  || — || August 10, 2002 || Socorro || LINEAR || — || align=right | 4.1 km || 
|-id=181 bgcolor=#E9E9E9
| 172181 ||  || — || August 10, 2002 || Socorro || LINEAR || — || align=right | 2.6 km || 
|-id=182 bgcolor=#E9E9E9
| 172182 ||  || — || August 12, 2002 || Socorro || LINEAR || — || align=right | 2.9 km || 
|-id=183 bgcolor=#E9E9E9
| 172183 ||  || — || August 12, 2002 || Socorro || LINEAR || — || align=right | 2.5 km || 
|-id=184 bgcolor=#E9E9E9
| 172184 ||  || — || August 10, 2002 || Socorro || LINEAR || — || align=right | 3.1 km || 
|-id=185 bgcolor=#E9E9E9
| 172185 ||  || — || August 12, 2002 || Socorro || LINEAR || — || align=right | 4.7 km || 
|-id=186 bgcolor=#E9E9E9
| 172186 ||  || — || August 13, 2002 || Socorro || LINEAR || — || align=right | 2.4 km || 
|-id=187 bgcolor=#E9E9E9
| 172187 ||  || — || August 12, 2002 || Socorro || LINEAR || — || align=right | 3.0 km || 
|-id=188 bgcolor=#E9E9E9
| 172188 ||  || — || August 14, 2002 || Anderson Mesa || LONEOS || — || align=right | 4.3 km || 
|-id=189 bgcolor=#E9E9E9
| 172189 ||  || — || August 13, 2002 || Anderson Mesa || LONEOS || — || align=right | 1.6 km || 
|-id=190 bgcolor=#E9E9E9
| 172190 ||  || — || August 14, 2002 || Socorro || LINEAR || — || align=right | 2.7 km || 
|-id=191 bgcolor=#E9E9E9
| 172191 Ralphmcnutt ||  ||  || August 10, 2002 || Cerro Tololo || M. W. Buie || — || align=right | 2.7 km || 
|-id=192 bgcolor=#E9E9E9
| 172192 ||  || — || August 8, 2002 || Palomar || S. F. Hönig || — || align=right | 3.5 km || 
|-id=193 bgcolor=#E9E9E9
| 172193 ||  || — || August 8, 2002 || Palomar || S. F. Hönig || — || align=right | 1.4 km || 
|-id=194 bgcolor=#E9E9E9
| 172194 ||  || — || August 8, 2002 || Palomar || S. F. Hönig || — || align=right | 1.9 km || 
|-id=195 bgcolor=#E9E9E9
| 172195 ||  || — || August 19, 2002 || Palomar || NEAT || — || align=right | 3.0 km || 
|-id=196 bgcolor=#E9E9E9
| 172196 ||  || — || August 26, 2002 || Palomar || NEAT || — || align=right | 1.6 km || 
|-id=197 bgcolor=#E9E9E9
| 172197 ||  || — || August 26, 2002 || Palomar || NEAT || — || align=right | 2.0 km || 
|-id=198 bgcolor=#E9E9E9
| 172198 ||  || — || August 28, 2002 || Palomar || NEAT || — || align=right | 3.4 km || 
|-id=199 bgcolor=#E9E9E9
| 172199 ||  || — || August 29, 2002 || Palomar || NEAT || ADE || align=right | 4.3 km || 
|-id=200 bgcolor=#E9E9E9
| 172200 ||  || — || August 29, 2002 || Palomar || NEAT || — || align=right | 2.3 km || 
|}

172201–172300 

|-bgcolor=#E9E9E9
| 172201 ||  || — || August 29, 2002 || Palomar || NEAT || — || align=right | 2.5 km || 
|-id=202 bgcolor=#E9E9E9
| 172202 ||  || — || August 29, 2002 || Palomar || NEAT || — || align=right | 1.7 km || 
|-id=203 bgcolor=#E9E9E9
| 172203 ||  || — || August 30, 2002 || Kitt Peak || Spacewatch || — || align=right | 1.6 km || 
|-id=204 bgcolor=#E9E9E9
| 172204 ||  || — || August 29, 2002 || Palomar || S. F. Hönig || — || align=right | 4.7 km || 
|-id=205 bgcolor=#E9E9E9
| 172205 ||  || — || August 29, 2002 || Palomar || S. F. Hönig || — || align=right | 2.0 km || 
|-id=206 bgcolor=#E9E9E9
| 172206 ||  || — || August 29, 2002 || Palomar || S. F. Hönig || — || align=right | 1.4 km || 
|-id=207 bgcolor=#E9E9E9
| 172207 ||  || — || August 18, 2002 || Palomar || NEAT || — || align=right | 2.4 km || 
|-id=208 bgcolor=#E9E9E9
| 172208 ||  || — || August 28, 2002 || Palomar || NEAT || — || align=right | 1.2 km || 
|-id=209 bgcolor=#E9E9E9
| 172209 ||  || — || August 28, 2002 || Palomar || NEAT || — || align=right | 1.1 km || 
|-id=210 bgcolor=#E9E9E9
| 172210 ||  || — || August 29, 2002 || Palomar || NEAT || — || align=right | 2.5 km || 
|-id=211 bgcolor=#fefefe
| 172211 ||  || — || August 27, 2002 || Palomar || NEAT || — || align=right | 1.4 km || 
|-id=212 bgcolor=#fefefe
| 172212 ||  || — || August 27, 2002 || Palomar || NEAT || — || align=right | 1.5 km || 
|-id=213 bgcolor=#E9E9E9
| 172213 ||  || — || August 17, 2002 || Palomar || NEAT || — || align=right | 1.9 km || 
|-id=214 bgcolor=#E9E9E9
| 172214 ||  || — || August 29, 2002 || Palomar || NEAT || — || align=right | 2.2 km || 
|-id=215 bgcolor=#E9E9E9
| 172215 ||  || — || September 4, 2002 || Palomar || NEAT || — || align=right | 4.6 km || 
|-id=216 bgcolor=#E9E9E9
| 172216 ||  || — || September 5, 2002 || Socorro || LINEAR || — || align=right | 3.6 km || 
|-id=217 bgcolor=#E9E9E9
| 172217 ||  || — || September 5, 2002 || Socorro || LINEAR || — || align=right | 2.2 km || 
|-id=218 bgcolor=#E9E9E9
| 172218 ||  || — || September 5, 2002 || Socorro || LINEAR || ADE || align=right | 4.3 km || 
|-id=219 bgcolor=#E9E9E9
| 172219 ||  || — || September 5, 2002 || Socorro || LINEAR || — || align=right | 2.6 km || 
|-id=220 bgcolor=#E9E9E9
| 172220 ||  || — || September 5, 2002 || Anderson Mesa || LONEOS || — || align=right | 1.6 km || 
|-id=221 bgcolor=#E9E9E9
| 172221 ||  || — || September 5, 2002 || Socorro || LINEAR || — || align=right | 4.1 km || 
|-id=222 bgcolor=#E9E9E9
| 172222 ||  || — || September 5, 2002 || Socorro || LINEAR || — || align=right | 2.9 km || 
|-id=223 bgcolor=#E9E9E9
| 172223 ||  || — || September 3, 2002 || Palomar || NEAT || EUN || align=right | 2.9 km || 
|-id=224 bgcolor=#E9E9E9
| 172224 ||  || — || September 5, 2002 || Socorro || LINEAR || — || align=right | 2.6 km || 
|-id=225 bgcolor=#E9E9E9
| 172225 ||  || — || September 5, 2002 || Socorro || LINEAR || — || align=right | 3.9 km || 
|-id=226 bgcolor=#E9E9E9
| 172226 ||  || — || September 5, 2002 || Socorro || LINEAR || — || align=right | 4.1 km || 
|-id=227 bgcolor=#E9E9E9
| 172227 ||  || — || September 6, 2002 || Socorro || LINEAR || — || align=right | 3.4 km || 
|-id=228 bgcolor=#E9E9E9
| 172228 ||  || — || September 5, 2002 || Socorro || LINEAR || — || align=right | 2.5 km || 
|-id=229 bgcolor=#d6d6d6
| 172229 ||  || — || September 5, 2002 || Socorro || LINEAR || KOR || align=right | 2.2 km || 
|-id=230 bgcolor=#d6d6d6
| 172230 ||  || — || September 5, 2002 || Socorro || LINEAR || KOR || align=right | 2.2 km || 
|-id=231 bgcolor=#E9E9E9
| 172231 ||  || — || September 10, 2002 || Palomar || NEAT || EUN || align=right | 1.8 km || 
|-id=232 bgcolor=#E9E9E9
| 172232 ||  || — || September 11, 2002 || Palomar || NEAT || ADE || align=right | 3.6 km || 
|-id=233 bgcolor=#E9E9E9
| 172233 ||  || — || September 10, 2002 || Palomar || NEAT || MAR || align=right | 1.9 km || 
|-id=234 bgcolor=#E9E9E9
| 172234 ||  || — || September 11, 2002 || Palomar || NEAT || WIT || align=right | 1.3 km || 
|-id=235 bgcolor=#E9E9E9
| 172235 ||  || — || September 11, 2002 || Haleakala || NEAT || MAR || align=right | 1.7 km || 
|-id=236 bgcolor=#E9E9E9
| 172236 ||  || — || September 13, 2002 || Socorro || LINEAR || DOR || align=right | 5.4 km || 
|-id=237 bgcolor=#E9E9E9
| 172237 ||  || — || September 13, 2002 || Kitt Peak || Spacewatch || — || align=right | 2.9 km || 
|-id=238 bgcolor=#E9E9E9
| 172238 ||  || — || September 14, 2002 || Kitt Peak || Spacewatch || — || align=right | 4.1 km || 
|-id=239 bgcolor=#E9E9E9
| 172239 ||  || — || September 11, 2002 || Palomar || NEAT || — || align=right | 3.1 km || 
|-id=240 bgcolor=#E9E9E9
| 172240 ||  || — || September 12, 2002 || Palomar || NEAT || — || align=right | 2.4 km || 
|-id=241 bgcolor=#E9E9E9
| 172241 ||  || — || September 12, 2002 || Haleakala || NEAT || — || align=right | 2.0 km || 
|-id=242 bgcolor=#E9E9E9
| 172242 ||  || — || September 13, 2002 || Palomar || NEAT || — || align=right | 3.0 km || 
|-id=243 bgcolor=#E9E9E9
| 172243 ||  || — || September 13, 2002 || Palomar || NEAT || — || align=right | 4.0 km || 
|-id=244 bgcolor=#E9E9E9
| 172244 ||  || — || September 14, 2002 || Palomar || NEAT || NEM || align=right | 3.6 km || 
|-id=245 bgcolor=#E9E9E9
| 172245 ||  || — || September 14, 2002 || Palomar || NEAT || — || align=right | 1.6 km || 
|-id=246 bgcolor=#E9E9E9
| 172246 ||  || — || September 13, 2002 || Haleakala || NEAT || — || align=right | 3.4 km || 
|-id=247 bgcolor=#E9E9E9
| 172247 ||  || — || September 13, 2002 || Anderson Mesa || LONEOS || PAE || align=right | 6.2 km || 
|-id=248 bgcolor=#E9E9E9
| 172248 ||  || — || September 13, 2002 || Palomar || NEAT || — || align=right | 4.5 km || 
|-id=249 bgcolor=#E9E9E9
| 172249 ||  || — || September 13, 2002 || Haleakala || NEAT || MIS || align=right | 3.7 km || 
|-id=250 bgcolor=#E9E9E9
| 172250 ||  || — || September 11, 2002 || Palomar || M. White, M. Collins || — || align=right | 1.5 km || 
|-id=251 bgcolor=#E9E9E9
| 172251 ||  || — || September 15, 2002 || Palomar || R. Matson || — || align=right | 1.8 km || 
|-id=252 bgcolor=#E9E9E9
| 172252 ||  || — || September 13, 2002 || Palomar || NEAT || — || align=right | 1.5 km || 
|-id=253 bgcolor=#E9E9E9
| 172253 ||  || — || September 1, 2002 || Haleakala || NEAT || — || align=right | 2.2 km || 
|-id=254 bgcolor=#E9E9E9
| 172254 ||  || — || September 27, 2002 || Palomar || NEAT || — || align=right | 2.2 km || 
|-id=255 bgcolor=#E9E9E9
| 172255 ||  || — || September 27, 2002 || Palomar || NEAT || PAD || align=right | 2.4 km || 
|-id=256 bgcolor=#E9E9E9
| 172256 ||  || — || September 27, 2002 || Palomar || NEAT || — || align=right | 3.1 km || 
|-id=257 bgcolor=#E9E9E9
| 172257 ||  || — || September 27, 2002 || Palomar || NEAT || — || align=right | 3.5 km || 
|-id=258 bgcolor=#E9E9E9
| 172258 ||  || — || September 27, 2002 || Palomar || NEAT || AST || align=right | 3.8 km || 
|-id=259 bgcolor=#E9E9E9
| 172259 ||  || — || September 28, 2002 || Haleakala || NEAT || — || align=right | 2.2 km || 
|-id=260 bgcolor=#E9E9E9
| 172260 ||  || — || September 30, 2002 || Haleakala || NEAT || — || align=right | 2.9 km || 
|-id=261 bgcolor=#E9E9E9
| 172261 ||  || — || September 16, 2002 || Palomar || NEAT || — || align=right | 1.7 km || 
|-id=262 bgcolor=#E9E9E9
| 172262 ||  || — || September 30, 2002 || Socorro || LINEAR || GEF || align=right | 2.2 km || 
|-id=263 bgcolor=#E9E9E9
| 172263 ||  || — || September 16, 2002 || Palomar || NEAT || — || align=right | 3.6 km || 
|-id=264 bgcolor=#E9E9E9
| 172264 ||  || — || October 2, 2002 || Socorro || LINEAR || AGN || align=right | 2.4 km || 
|-id=265 bgcolor=#E9E9E9
| 172265 ||  || — || October 2, 2002 || Socorro || LINEAR || WIT || align=right | 2.0 km || 
|-id=266 bgcolor=#E9E9E9
| 172266 ||  || — || October 2, 2002 || Socorro || LINEAR || — || align=right | 3.4 km || 
|-id=267 bgcolor=#E9E9E9
| 172267 ||  || — || October 2, 2002 || Socorro || LINEAR || AEO || align=right | 2.3 km || 
|-id=268 bgcolor=#E9E9E9
| 172268 ||  || — || October 4, 2002 || Socorro || LINEAR || — || align=right | 2.5 km || 
|-id=269 bgcolor=#E9E9E9
| 172269 Tator ||  ||  || October 9, 2002 || Mülheim-Ruhr || A. Martin, A. Boeker || — || align=right | 4.2 km || 
|-id=270 bgcolor=#E9E9E9
| 172270 ||  || — || October 3, 2002 || Palomar || NEAT || EUN || align=right | 2.5 km || 
|-id=271 bgcolor=#E9E9E9
| 172271 ||  || — || October 1, 2002 || Socorro || LINEAR || — || align=right | 4.7 km || 
|-id=272 bgcolor=#E9E9E9
| 172272 ||  || — || October 2, 2002 || Haleakala || NEAT || — || align=right | 3.8 km || 
|-id=273 bgcolor=#E9E9E9
| 172273 ||  || — || October 3, 2002 || Palomar || NEAT || — || align=right | 2.4 km || 
|-id=274 bgcolor=#d6d6d6
| 172274 ||  || — || October 3, 2002 || Socorro || LINEAR || — || align=right | 3.3 km || 
|-id=275 bgcolor=#E9E9E9
| 172275 ||  || — || October 1, 2002 || Haleakala || NEAT || GEF || align=right | 2.1 km || 
|-id=276 bgcolor=#d6d6d6
| 172276 ||  || — || October 3, 2002 || Socorro || LINEAR || BRA || align=right | 2.4 km || 
|-id=277 bgcolor=#E9E9E9
| 172277 ||  || — || October 3, 2002 || Socorro || LINEAR || — || align=right | 2.4 km || 
|-id=278 bgcolor=#E9E9E9
| 172278 ||  || — || October 3, 2002 || Socorro || LINEAR || — || align=right | 1.9 km || 
|-id=279 bgcolor=#E9E9E9
| 172279 ||  || — || October 3, 2002 || Palomar || NEAT || — || align=right | 3.8 km || 
|-id=280 bgcolor=#d6d6d6
| 172280 ||  || — || October 4, 2002 || Palomar || NEAT || EOS || align=right | 7.3 km || 
|-id=281 bgcolor=#fefefe
| 172281 ||  || — || October 4, 2002 || Socorro || LINEAR || V || align=right | 1.5 km || 
|-id=282 bgcolor=#d6d6d6
| 172282 ||  || — || October 4, 2002 || Palomar || NEAT || — || align=right | 5.1 km || 
|-id=283 bgcolor=#E9E9E9
| 172283 ||  || — || October 4, 2002 || Anderson Mesa || LONEOS || — || align=right | 6.2 km || 
|-id=284 bgcolor=#E9E9E9
| 172284 ||  || — || October 4, 2002 || Anderson Mesa || LONEOS || — || align=right | 4.4 km || 
|-id=285 bgcolor=#d6d6d6
| 172285 ||  || — || October 4, 2002 || Anderson Mesa || LONEOS || — || align=right | 6.1 km || 
|-id=286 bgcolor=#E9E9E9
| 172286 ||  || — || October 4, 2002 || Anderson Mesa || LONEOS || — || align=right | 4.6 km || 
|-id=287 bgcolor=#E9E9E9
| 172287 ||  || — || October 5, 2002 || Socorro || LINEAR || — || align=right | 1.2 km || 
|-id=288 bgcolor=#E9E9E9
| 172288 ||  || — || October 5, 2002 || Palomar || NEAT || WIT || align=right | 1.5 km || 
|-id=289 bgcolor=#E9E9E9
| 172289 ||  || — || October 5, 2002 || Palomar || NEAT || MAR || align=right | 2.2 km || 
|-id=290 bgcolor=#E9E9E9
| 172290 ||  || — || October 3, 2002 || Palomar || NEAT || — || align=right | 4.7 km || 
|-id=291 bgcolor=#E9E9E9
| 172291 ||  || — || October 4, 2002 || Socorro || LINEAR || — || align=right | 3.8 km || 
|-id=292 bgcolor=#E9E9E9
| 172292 ||  || — || October 11, 2002 || Palomar || NEAT || — || align=right | 3.9 km || 
|-id=293 bgcolor=#d6d6d6
| 172293 ||  || — || October 11, 2002 || Palomar || NEAT || BRA || align=right | 4.7 km || 
|-id=294 bgcolor=#E9E9E9
| 172294 ||  || — || October 13, 2002 || Palomar || NEAT || — || align=right | 1.6 km || 
|-id=295 bgcolor=#E9E9E9
| 172295 ||  || — || October 3, 2002 || Socorro || LINEAR || — || align=right | 4.0 km || 
|-id=296 bgcolor=#d6d6d6
| 172296 ||  || — || October 3, 2002 || Socorro || LINEAR || BRA || align=right | 2.2 km || 
|-id=297 bgcolor=#E9E9E9
| 172297 ||  || — || October 6, 2002 || Anderson Mesa || LONEOS || — || align=right | 2.6 km || 
|-id=298 bgcolor=#E9E9E9
| 172298 ||  || — || October 3, 2002 || Socorro || LINEAR || — || align=right | 3.3 km || 
|-id=299 bgcolor=#E9E9E9
| 172299 ||  || — || October 7, 2002 || Palomar || NEAT || HOF || align=right | 4.6 km || 
|-id=300 bgcolor=#E9E9E9
| 172300 ||  || — || October 6, 2002 || Haleakala || NEAT || — || align=right | 3.5 km || 
|}

172301–172400 

|-bgcolor=#E9E9E9
| 172301 ||  || — || October 6, 2002 || Socorro || LINEAR || — || align=right | 4.9 km || 
|-id=302 bgcolor=#E9E9E9
| 172302 ||  || — || October 6, 2002 || Socorro || LINEAR || MAR || align=right | 2.2 km || 
|-id=303 bgcolor=#E9E9E9
| 172303 ||  || — || October 6, 2002 || Socorro || LINEAR || — || align=right | 4.6 km || 
|-id=304 bgcolor=#E9E9E9
| 172304 ||  || — || October 7, 2002 || Socorro || LINEAR || EUN || align=right | 2.1 km || 
|-id=305 bgcolor=#E9E9E9
| 172305 ||  || — || October 9, 2002 || Socorro || LINEAR || — || align=right | 4.0 km || 
|-id=306 bgcolor=#E9E9E9
| 172306 ||  || — || October 7, 2002 || Anderson Mesa || LONEOS || XIZ || align=right | 2.3 km || 
|-id=307 bgcolor=#E9E9E9
| 172307 ||  || — || October 10, 2002 || Palomar || NEAT || — || align=right | 3.8 km || 
|-id=308 bgcolor=#E9E9E9
| 172308 ||  || — || October 8, 2002 || Anderson Mesa || LONEOS || — || align=right | 3.5 km || 
|-id=309 bgcolor=#E9E9E9
| 172309 ||  || — || October 9, 2002 || Socorro || LINEAR || — || align=right | 4.1 km || 
|-id=310 bgcolor=#E9E9E9
| 172310 ||  || — || October 9, 2002 || Socorro || LINEAR || NEM || align=right | 3.3 km || 
|-id=311 bgcolor=#E9E9E9
| 172311 ||  || — || October 9, 2002 || Socorro || LINEAR || GEF || align=right | 2.5 km || 
|-id=312 bgcolor=#d6d6d6
| 172312 ||  || — || October 10, 2002 || Socorro || LINEAR || EOS || align=right | 3.8 km || 
|-id=313 bgcolor=#E9E9E9
| 172313 ||  || — || October 10, 2002 || Socorro || LINEAR || GEF || align=right | 2.2 km || 
|-id=314 bgcolor=#E9E9E9
| 172314 ||  || — || October 10, 2002 || Socorro || LINEAR || — || align=right | 3.1 km || 
|-id=315 bgcolor=#E9E9E9
| 172315 Changqiaoxiaoxue ||  ||  || October 15, 2002 || Palomar || NEAT || — || align=right | 4.2 km || 
|-id=316 bgcolor=#E9E9E9
| 172316 ||  || — || October 11, 2002 || Socorro || LINEAR || — || align=right | 2.0 km || 
|-id=317 bgcolor=#E9E9E9
| 172317 Walterbos ||  ||  || October 4, 2002 || Apache Point || SDSS || — || align=right | 3.9 km || 
|-id=318 bgcolor=#E9E9E9
| 172318 Wangshui ||  ||  || October 5, 2002 || Apache Point || SDSS || — || align=right | 3.6 km || 
|-id=319 bgcolor=#E9E9E9
| 172319 ||  || — || October 3, 2002 || Socorro || LINEAR || — || align=right | 3.7 km || 
|-id=320 bgcolor=#d6d6d6
| 172320 ||  || — || October 15, 2002 || Palomar || NEAT || — || align=right | 3.7 km || 
|-id=321 bgcolor=#E9E9E9
| 172321 ||  || — || October 28, 2002 || Palomar || NEAT || WIT || align=right | 1.8 km || 
|-id=322 bgcolor=#E9E9E9
| 172322 ||  || — || October 30, 2002 || Haleakala || NEAT || — || align=right | 4.2 km || 
|-id=323 bgcolor=#E9E9E9
| 172323 ||  || — || October 28, 2002 || Palomar || NEAT || — || align=right | 1.8 km || 
|-id=324 bgcolor=#E9E9E9
| 172324 ||  || — || October 31, 2002 || Socorro || LINEAR || — || align=right | 3.8 km || 
|-id=325 bgcolor=#E9E9E9
| 172325 ||  || — || October 31, 2002 || Kvistaberg || UDAS || — || align=right | 1.8 km || 
|-id=326 bgcolor=#E9E9E9
| 172326 ||  || — || October 31, 2002 || Socorro || LINEAR || — || align=right | 3.0 km || 
|-id=327 bgcolor=#E9E9E9
| 172327 || 2002 VF || — || November 1, 2002 || Socorro || LINEAR || — || align=right | 4.3 km || 
|-id=328 bgcolor=#E9E9E9
| 172328 ||  || — || November 1, 2002 || Palomar || NEAT || — || align=right | 4.1 km || 
|-id=329 bgcolor=#E9E9E9
| 172329 ||  || — || November 4, 2002 || Kitt Peak || Spacewatch || AGN || align=right | 1.7 km || 
|-id=330 bgcolor=#E9E9E9
| 172330 ||  || — || November 2, 2002 || Haleakala || NEAT || — || align=right | 3.8 km || 
|-id=331 bgcolor=#E9E9E9
| 172331 ||  || — || November 4, 2002 || Fountain Hills || Fountain Hills Obs. || NEM || align=right | 4.6 km || 
|-id=332 bgcolor=#d6d6d6
| 172332 ||  || — || November 4, 2002 || Kitt Peak || Spacewatch || — || align=right | 3.3 km || 
|-id=333 bgcolor=#E9E9E9
| 172333 ||  || — || November 5, 2002 || Socorro || LINEAR || NEM || align=right | 3.9 km || 
|-id=334 bgcolor=#E9E9E9
| 172334 ||  || — || November 5, 2002 || Socorro || LINEAR || WIT || align=right | 1.8 km || 
|-id=335 bgcolor=#E9E9E9
| 172335 ||  || — || November 5, 2002 || Socorro || LINEAR || GEF || align=right | 2.3 km || 
|-id=336 bgcolor=#E9E9E9
| 172336 ||  || — || November 2, 2002 || Haleakala || NEAT || — || align=right | 4.3 km || 
|-id=337 bgcolor=#E9E9E9
| 172337 ||  || — || November 5, 2002 || Socorro || LINEAR || VIB || align=right | 2.7 km || 
|-id=338 bgcolor=#d6d6d6
| 172338 ||  || — || November 4, 2002 || Kitt Peak || Spacewatch || — || align=right | 5.3 km || 
|-id=339 bgcolor=#E9E9E9
| 172339 ||  || — || November 6, 2002 || Haleakala || NEAT || EUN || align=right | 2.4 km || 
|-id=340 bgcolor=#E9E9E9
| 172340 ||  || — || November 7, 2002 || Socorro || LINEAR || — || align=right | 3.6 km || 
|-id=341 bgcolor=#E9E9E9
| 172341 ||  || — || November 11, 2002 || Socorro || LINEAR || — || align=right | 5.4 km || 
|-id=342 bgcolor=#d6d6d6
| 172342 ||  || — || November 11, 2002 || Socorro || LINEAR || — || align=right | 5.1 km || 
|-id=343 bgcolor=#E9E9E9
| 172343 ||  || — || November 12, 2002 || Anderson Mesa || LONEOS || — || align=right | 3.2 km || 
|-id=344 bgcolor=#d6d6d6
| 172344 ||  || — || November 12, 2002 || Socorro || LINEAR || EOS || align=right | 3.1 km || 
|-id=345 bgcolor=#E9E9E9
| 172345 ||  || — || November 12, 2002 || Socorro || LINEAR || — || align=right | 5.0 km || 
|-id=346 bgcolor=#E9E9E9
| 172346 ||  || — || November 12, 2002 || Socorro || LINEAR || — || align=right | 4.5 km || 
|-id=347 bgcolor=#E9E9E9
| 172347 ||  || — || November 12, 2002 || Socorro || LINEAR || — || align=right | 4.6 km || 
|-id=348 bgcolor=#d6d6d6
| 172348 ||  || — || November 13, 2002 || Palomar || NEAT || — || align=right | 3.6 km || 
|-id=349 bgcolor=#E9E9E9
| 172349 ||  || — || November 13, 2002 || Palomar || NEAT || GEF || align=right | 2.4 km || 
|-id=350 bgcolor=#E9E9E9
| 172350 ||  || — || November 14, 2002 || Palomar || NEAT || INO || align=right | 2.1 km || 
|-id=351 bgcolor=#E9E9E9
| 172351 ||  || — || November 12, 2002 || Socorro || LINEAR || — || align=right | 4.5 km || 
|-id=352 bgcolor=#d6d6d6
| 172352 ||  || — || November 14, 2002 || Socorro || LINEAR || — || align=right | 3.9 km || 
|-id=353 bgcolor=#E9E9E9
| 172353 ||  || — || November 5, 2002 || Anderson Mesa || LONEOS || PAD || align=right | 4.2 km || 
|-id=354 bgcolor=#d6d6d6
| 172354 ||  || — || November 24, 2002 || Palomar || NEAT || — || align=right | 3.7 km || 
|-id=355 bgcolor=#d6d6d6
| 172355 || 2002 XM || — || December 1, 2002 || Socorro || LINEAR || — || align=right | 5.6 km || 
|-id=356 bgcolor=#E9E9E9
| 172356 ||  || — || December 2, 2002 || Socorro || LINEAR || GEF || align=right | 2.3 km || 
|-id=357 bgcolor=#E9E9E9
| 172357 ||  || — || December 3, 2002 || Palomar || NEAT || — || align=right | 4.8 km || 
|-id=358 bgcolor=#d6d6d6
| 172358 ||  || — || December 3, 2002 || Palomar || NEAT || EOS || align=right | 3.0 km || 
|-id=359 bgcolor=#E9E9E9
| 172359 ||  || — || December 3, 2002 || Palomar || NEAT || — || align=right | 4.9 km || 
|-id=360 bgcolor=#d6d6d6
| 172360 ||  || — || December 9, 2002 || Desert Eagle || W. K. Y. Yeung || — || align=right | 3.0 km || 
|-id=361 bgcolor=#d6d6d6
| 172361 ||  || — || December 10, 2002 || Socorro || LINEAR || — || align=right | 5.4 km || 
|-id=362 bgcolor=#d6d6d6
| 172362 ||  || — || December 10, 2002 || Palomar || NEAT || — || align=right | 5.8 km || 
|-id=363 bgcolor=#E9E9E9
| 172363 ||  || — || December 10, 2002 || Socorro || LINEAR || HOF || align=right | 3.8 km || 
|-id=364 bgcolor=#E9E9E9
| 172364 ||  || — || December 11, 2002 || Socorro || LINEAR || — || align=right | 4.7 km || 
|-id=365 bgcolor=#d6d6d6
| 172365 ||  || — || December 11, 2002 || Socorro || LINEAR || — || align=right | 6.3 km || 
|-id=366 bgcolor=#E9E9E9
| 172366 ||  || — || December 10, 2002 || Socorro || LINEAR || — || align=right | 4.2 km || 
|-id=367 bgcolor=#d6d6d6
| 172367 ||  || — || December 11, 2002 || Socorro || LINEAR || — || align=right | 4.8 km || 
|-id=368 bgcolor=#d6d6d6
| 172368 ||  || — || December 11, 2002 || Socorro || LINEAR || — || align=right | 4.9 km || 
|-id=369 bgcolor=#d6d6d6
| 172369 ||  || — || December 11, 2002 || Socorro || LINEAR || BRA || align=right | 2.9 km || 
|-id=370 bgcolor=#d6d6d6
| 172370 ||  || — || December 11, 2002 || Socorro || LINEAR || FIR || align=right | 7.9 km || 
|-id=371 bgcolor=#d6d6d6
| 172371 ||  || — || December 5, 2002 || Socorro || LINEAR || — || align=right | 3.4 km || 
|-id=372 bgcolor=#d6d6d6
| 172372 ||  || — || December 5, 2002 || Socorro || LINEAR || — || align=right | 4.6 km || 
|-id=373 bgcolor=#d6d6d6
| 172373 ||  || — || December 5, 2002 || Socorro || LINEAR || — || align=right | 3.4 km || 
|-id=374 bgcolor=#d6d6d6
| 172374 ||  || — || December 5, 2002 || Socorro || LINEAR || — || align=right | 4.2 km || 
|-id=375 bgcolor=#d6d6d6
| 172375 ||  || — || December 31, 2002 || Socorro || LINEAR || THM || align=right | 3.5 km || 
|-id=376 bgcolor=#d6d6d6
| 172376 ||  || — || December 31, 2002 || Socorro || LINEAR || — || align=right | 5.6 km || 
|-id=377 bgcolor=#d6d6d6
| 172377 ||  || — || December 31, 2002 || Socorro || LINEAR || — || align=right | 4.9 km || 
|-id=378 bgcolor=#d6d6d6
| 172378 ||  || — || December 31, 2002 || Socorro || LINEAR || — || align=right | 5.4 km || 
|-id=379 bgcolor=#d6d6d6
| 172379 ||  || — || January 2, 2003 || Socorro || LINEAR || — || align=right | 5.6 km || 
|-id=380 bgcolor=#E9E9E9
| 172380 ||  || — || January 1, 2003 || Socorro || LINEAR || — || align=right | 4.1 km || 
|-id=381 bgcolor=#E9E9E9
| 172381 ||  || — || January 1, 2003 || Socorro || LINEAR || — || align=right | 4.4 km || 
|-id=382 bgcolor=#d6d6d6
| 172382 ||  || — || January 1, 2003 || Socorro || LINEAR || — || align=right | 4.8 km || 
|-id=383 bgcolor=#E9E9E9
| 172383 ||  || — || January 4, 2003 || Socorro || LINEAR || — || align=right | 4.4 km || 
|-id=384 bgcolor=#d6d6d6
| 172384 ||  || — || January 5, 2003 || Socorro || LINEAR || EOS || align=right | 3.3 km || 
|-id=385 bgcolor=#d6d6d6
| 172385 ||  || — || January 5, 2003 || Socorro || LINEAR || — || align=right | 4.5 km || 
|-id=386 bgcolor=#d6d6d6
| 172386 ||  || — || January 7, 2003 || Socorro || LINEAR || — || align=right | 6.4 km || 
|-id=387 bgcolor=#d6d6d6
| 172387 ||  || — || January 7, 2003 || Socorro || LINEAR || — || align=right | 6.6 km || 
|-id=388 bgcolor=#d6d6d6
| 172388 ||  || — || January 5, 2003 || Socorro || LINEAR || — || align=right | 3.3 km || 
|-id=389 bgcolor=#d6d6d6
| 172389 ||  || — || January 5, 2003 || Socorro || LINEAR || — || align=right | 4.5 km || 
|-id=390 bgcolor=#d6d6d6
| 172390 ||  || — || January 5, 2003 || Socorro || LINEAR || — || align=right | 3.9 km || 
|-id=391 bgcolor=#d6d6d6
| 172391 ||  || — || January 5, 2003 || Socorro || LINEAR || — || align=right | 5.3 km || 
|-id=392 bgcolor=#d6d6d6
| 172392 ||  || — || January 5, 2003 || Socorro || LINEAR || URS || align=right | 5.6 km || 
|-id=393 bgcolor=#d6d6d6
| 172393 ||  || — || January 8, 2003 || Socorro || LINEAR || — || align=right | 5.0 km || 
|-id=394 bgcolor=#d6d6d6
| 172394 ||  || — || January 10, 2003 || Socorro || LINEAR || — || align=right | 5.4 km || 
|-id=395 bgcolor=#d6d6d6
| 172395 ||  || — || January 11, 2003 || Goodricke-Pigott || R. A. Tucker || LIX || align=right | 4.7 km || 
|-id=396 bgcolor=#E9E9E9
| 172396 ||  || — || January 25, 2003 || Anderson Mesa || LONEOS || — || align=right | 4.3 km || 
|-id=397 bgcolor=#d6d6d6
| 172397 ||  || — || January 26, 2003 || Haleakala || NEAT || — || align=right | 5.4 km || 
|-id=398 bgcolor=#d6d6d6
| 172398 ||  || — || January 27, 2003 || Socorro || LINEAR || — || align=right | 4.8 km || 
|-id=399 bgcolor=#E9E9E9
| 172399 ||  || — || January 25, 2003 || Palomar || NEAT || JUN || align=right | 5.2 km || 
|-id=400 bgcolor=#d6d6d6
| 172400 ||  || — || January 25, 2003 || Anderson Mesa || LONEOS || EOS || align=right | 2.8 km || 
|}

172401–172500 

|-bgcolor=#d6d6d6
| 172401 ||  || — || January 25, 2003 || Palomar || NEAT || TIR || align=right | 4.3 km || 
|-id=402 bgcolor=#d6d6d6
| 172402 ||  || — || January 27, 2003 || Socorro || LINEAR || — || align=right | 5.1 km || 
|-id=403 bgcolor=#d6d6d6
| 172403 ||  || — || January 27, 2003 || Socorro || LINEAR || — || align=right | 4.2 km || 
|-id=404 bgcolor=#d6d6d6
| 172404 ||  || — || January 27, 2003 || Anderson Mesa || LONEOS || EOS || align=right | 3.3 km || 
|-id=405 bgcolor=#d6d6d6
| 172405 ||  || — || January 30, 2003 || Palomar || NEAT || — || align=right | 4.6 km || 
|-id=406 bgcolor=#d6d6d6
| 172406 ||  || — || January 27, 2003 || Socorro || LINEAR || — || align=right | 3.8 km || 
|-id=407 bgcolor=#E9E9E9
| 172407 ||  || — || January 30, 2003 || Anderson Mesa || LONEOS || — || align=right | 5.2 km || 
|-id=408 bgcolor=#d6d6d6
| 172408 ||  || — || January 29, 2003 || Palomar || NEAT || — || align=right | 5.0 km || 
|-id=409 bgcolor=#d6d6d6
| 172409 ||  || — || January 30, 2003 || Anderson Mesa || LONEOS || THM || align=right | 3.3 km || 
|-id=410 bgcolor=#d6d6d6
| 172410 ||  || — || February 1, 2003 || Anderson Mesa || LONEOS || EUP || align=right | 8.4 km || 
|-id=411 bgcolor=#d6d6d6
| 172411 ||  || — || February 3, 2003 || Palomar || NEAT || — || align=right | 5.0 km || 
|-id=412 bgcolor=#d6d6d6
| 172412 ||  || — || February 26, 2003 || Kleť || M. Tichý, M. Kočer || — || align=right | 7.0 km || 
|-id=413 bgcolor=#d6d6d6
| 172413 ||  || — || March 5, 2003 || Socorro || LINEAR || HYG || align=right | 4.7 km || 
|-id=414 bgcolor=#d6d6d6
| 172414 ||  || — || March 6, 2003 || Socorro || LINEAR || — || align=right | 4.6 km || 
|-id=415 bgcolor=#d6d6d6
| 172415 ||  || — || March 8, 2003 || Socorro || LINEAR || TIR || align=right | 3.8 km || 
|-id=416 bgcolor=#d6d6d6
| 172416 ||  || — || March 26, 2003 || Campo Imperatore || CINEOS || 7:4 || align=right | 6.4 km || 
|-id=417 bgcolor=#d6d6d6
| 172417 ||  || — || March 23, 2003 || Kitt Peak || Spacewatch || — || align=right | 2.9 km || 
|-id=418 bgcolor=#d6d6d6
| 172418 ||  || — || March 27, 2003 || Anderson Mesa || LONEOS || EUP || align=right | 9.5 km || 
|-id=419 bgcolor=#FA8072
| 172419 ||  || — || April 4, 2003 || Uccle || Uccle Obs. || H || align=right | 1.3 km || 
|-id=420 bgcolor=#d6d6d6
| 172420 ||  || — || April 9, 2003 || Palomar || NEAT || 7:4 || align=right | 4.8 km || 
|-id=421 bgcolor=#fefefe
| 172421 || 2003 HF || — || April 23, 2003 || Socorro || LINEAR || — || align=right | 1.5 km || 
|-id=422 bgcolor=#fefefe
| 172422 ||  || — || July 28, 2003 || Reedy Creek || J. Broughton || — || align=right | 1.1 km || 
|-id=423 bgcolor=#fefefe
| 172423 ||  || — || July 26, 2003 || Campo Imperatore || CINEOS || — || align=right | 1.4 km || 
|-id=424 bgcolor=#fefefe
| 172424 ||  || — || July 29, 2003 || Reedy Creek || J. Broughton || — || align=right data-sort-value="0.85" | 850 m || 
|-id=425 bgcolor=#FA8072
| 172425 Taliajacobi ||  ||  || July 25, 2003 || Wise || D. Polishook || — || align=right | 1.9 km || 
|-id=426 bgcolor=#fefefe
| 172426 ||  || — || July 30, 2003 || Socorro || LINEAR || — || align=right | 1.3 km || 
|-id=427 bgcolor=#fefefe
| 172427 ||  || — || August 2, 2003 || Haleakala || NEAT || — || align=right | 1.4 km || 
|-id=428 bgcolor=#fefefe
| 172428 ||  || — || August 1, 2003 || Socorro || LINEAR || — || align=right | 1.3 km || 
|-id=429 bgcolor=#fefefe
| 172429 ||  || — || August 19, 2003 || Campo Imperatore || CINEOS || — || align=right | 1.1 km || 
|-id=430 bgcolor=#fefefe
| 172430 Sergiofonti ||  ||  || August 20, 2003 || Campo Imperatore || CINEOS || V || align=right | 1.1 km || 
|-id=431 bgcolor=#fefefe
| 172431 ||  || — || August 20, 2003 || Campo Imperatore || CINEOS || — || align=right | 1.2 km || 
|-id=432 bgcolor=#fefefe
| 172432 ||  || — || August 22, 2003 || Palomar || NEAT || NYS || align=right data-sort-value="0.99" | 990 m || 
|-id=433 bgcolor=#fefefe
| 172433 ||  || — || August 20, 2003 || Palomar || NEAT || — || align=right | 1.2 km || 
|-id=434 bgcolor=#fefefe
| 172434 ||  || — || August 21, 2003 || Palomar || NEAT || — || align=right | 1.2 km || 
|-id=435 bgcolor=#fefefe
| 172435 ||  || — || August 22, 2003 || Palomar || NEAT || — || align=right | 1.0 km || 
|-id=436 bgcolor=#fefefe
| 172436 ||  || — || August 22, 2003 || Palomar || NEAT || — || align=right | 1.7 km || 
|-id=437 bgcolor=#fefefe
| 172437 ||  || — || August 22, 2003 || Palomar || NEAT || — || align=right | 1.7 km || 
|-id=438 bgcolor=#fefefe
| 172438 ||  || — || August 22, 2003 || Socorro || LINEAR || FLO || align=right | 1.1 km || 
|-id=439 bgcolor=#fefefe
| 172439 ||  || — || August 22, 2003 || Socorro || LINEAR || V || align=right | 1.4 km || 
|-id=440 bgcolor=#fefefe
| 172440 ||  || — || August 22, 2003 || Socorro || LINEAR || NYS || align=right | 1.4 km || 
|-id=441 bgcolor=#fefefe
| 172441 ||  || — || August 23, 2003 || Palomar || NEAT || — || align=right | 1.4 km || 
|-id=442 bgcolor=#fefefe
| 172442 ||  || — || August 20, 2003 || Palomar || NEAT || V || align=right data-sort-value="0.80" | 800 m || 
|-id=443 bgcolor=#fefefe
| 172443 ||  || — || August 23, 2003 || Socorro || LINEAR || — || align=right | 1.0 km || 
|-id=444 bgcolor=#fefefe
| 172444 ||  || — || August 23, 2003 || Socorro || LINEAR || NYS || align=right | 1.1 km || 
|-id=445 bgcolor=#fefefe
| 172445 ||  || — || August 23, 2003 || Socorro || LINEAR || — || align=right | 1.3 km || 
|-id=446 bgcolor=#fefefe
| 172446 ||  || — || August 23, 2003 || Palomar || NEAT || MAS || align=right | 1.2 km || 
|-id=447 bgcolor=#fefefe
| 172447 ||  || — || August 23, 2003 || Socorro || LINEAR || V || align=right | 1.2 km || 
|-id=448 bgcolor=#fefefe
| 172448 ||  || — || August 23, 2003 || Socorro || LINEAR || NYS || align=right | 1.2 km || 
|-id=449 bgcolor=#fefefe
| 172449 ||  || — || August 25, 2003 || Palomar || NEAT || NYS || align=right data-sort-value="0.84" | 840 m || 
|-id=450 bgcolor=#fefefe
| 172450 ||  || — || August 24, 2003 || Socorro || LINEAR || ERI || align=right | 1.7 km || 
|-id=451 bgcolor=#FA8072
| 172451 ||  || — || August 24, 2003 || Reedy Creek || J. Broughton || — || align=right | 1.4 km || 
|-id=452 bgcolor=#fefefe
| 172452 ||  || — || August 27, 2003 || Palomar || NEAT || FLO || align=right | 1.1 km || 
|-id=453 bgcolor=#fefefe
| 172453 ||  || — || August 27, 2003 || Palomar || NEAT || V || align=right | 1.0 km || 
|-id=454 bgcolor=#fefefe
| 172454 ||  || — || August 29, 2003 || Haleakala || NEAT || — || align=right | 2.0 km || 
|-id=455 bgcolor=#fefefe
| 172455 ||  || — || August 30, 2003 || Kitt Peak || Spacewatch || — || align=right | 1.2 km || 
|-id=456 bgcolor=#fefefe
| 172456 || 2003 RW || — || September 1, 2003 || Socorro || LINEAR || V || align=right | 1.1 km || 
|-id=457 bgcolor=#fefefe
| 172457 ||  || — || September 2, 2003 || Socorro || LINEAR || — || align=right | 1.1 km || 
|-id=458 bgcolor=#fefefe
| 172458 ||  || — || September 1, 2003 || Socorro || LINEAR || — || align=right | 1.4 km || 
|-id=459 bgcolor=#fefefe
| 172459 ||  || — || September 2, 2003 || Socorro || LINEAR || NYS || align=right | 1.2 km || 
|-id=460 bgcolor=#fefefe
| 172460 ||  || — || September 15, 2003 || Wrightwood || J. W. Young || — || align=right | 1.0 km || 
|-id=461 bgcolor=#fefefe
| 172461 ||  || — || September 16, 2003 || Kitt Peak || Spacewatch || MAS || align=right | 1.1 km || 
|-id=462 bgcolor=#fefefe
| 172462 ||  || — || September 16, 2003 || Kitt Peak || Spacewatch || MAS || align=right | 1.0 km || 
|-id=463 bgcolor=#fefefe
| 172463 ||  || — || September 17, 2003 || Desert Eagle || W. K. Y. Yeung || NYS || align=right | 1.2 km || 
|-id=464 bgcolor=#fefefe
| 172464 ||  || — || September 17, 2003 || Kitt Peak || Spacewatch || — || align=right data-sort-value="0.94" | 940 m || 
|-id=465 bgcolor=#fefefe
| 172465 ||  || — || September 17, 2003 || Kitt Peak || Spacewatch || NYS || align=right data-sort-value="0.91" | 910 m || 
|-id=466 bgcolor=#fefefe
| 172466 ||  || — || September 18, 2003 || Kitt Peak || Spacewatch || ERI || align=right | 3.2 km || 
|-id=467 bgcolor=#fefefe
| 172467 ||  || — || September 16, 2003 || Palomar || NEAT || — || align=right | 3.3 km || 
|-id=468 bgcolor=#fefefe
| 172468 ||  || — || September 16, 2003 || Palomar || NEAT || V || align=right | 1.1 km || 
|-id=469 bgcolor=#fefefe
| 172469 ||  || — || September 16, 2003 || Anderson Mesa || LONEOS || NYS || align=right | 1.2 km || 
|-id=470 bgcolor=#fefefe
| 172470 ||  || — || September 16, 2003 || Anderson Mesa || LONEOS || — || align=right | 1.5 km || 
|-id=471 bgcolor=#fefefe
| 172471 ||  || — || September 16, 2003 || Anderson Mesa || LONEOS || NYS || align=right | 1.2 km || 
|-id=472 bgcolor=#fefefe
| 172472 ||  || — || September 18, 2003 || Palomar || NEAT || — || align=right | 2.0 km || 
|-id=473 bgcolor=#fefefe
| 172473 ||  || — || September 16, 2003 || Anderson Mesa || LONEOS || V || align=right | 1.1 km || 
|-id=474 bgcolor=#fefefe
| 172474 ||  || — || September 18, 2003 || Kitt Peak || Spacewatch || — || align=right | 1.5 km || 
|-id=475 bgcolor=#fefefe
| 172475 ||  || — || September 18, 2003 || Kitt Peak || Spacewatch || MAS || align=right | 1.0 km || 
|-id=476 bgcolor=#fefefe
| 172476 ||  || — || September 19, 2003 || Kitt Peak || Spacewatch || V || align=right | 1.3 km || 
|-id=477 bgcolor=#fefefe
| 172477 ||  || — || September 16, 2003 || Palomar || NEAT || V || align=right | 1.3 km || 
|-id=478 bgcolor=#fefefe
| 172478 ||  || — || September 17, 2003 || Socorro || LINEAR || CLA || align=right | 2.4 km || 
|-id=479 bgcolor=#fefefe
| 172479 ||  || — || September 19, 2003 || Palomar || NEAT || FLO || align=right | 1.3 km || 
|-id=480 bgcolor=#fefefe
| 172480 ||  || — || September 19, 2003 || Socorro || LINEAR || NYS || align=right | 1.1 km || 
|-id=481 bgcolor=#fefefe
| 172481 ||  || — || September 20, 2003 || Socorro || LINEAR || — || align=right | 1.4 km || 
|-id=482 bgcolor=#fefefe
| 172482 ||  || — || September 20, 2003 || Haleakala || NEAT || V || align=right | 1.2 km || 
|-id=483 bgcolor=#fefefe
| 172483 ||  || — || September 20, 2003 || Palomar || NEAT || — || align=right | 1.5 km || 
|-id=484 bgcolor=#fefefe
| 172484 ||  || — || September 20, 2003 || Palomar || NEAT || FLO || align=right | 1.1 km || 
|-id=485 bgcolor=#fefefe
| 172485 ||  || — || September 16, 2003 || Palomar || NEAT || V || align=right | 1.2 km || 
|-id=486 bgcolor=#fefefe
| 172486 ||  || — || September 17, 2003 || Kitt Peak || Spacewatch || — || align=right | 1.2 km || 
|-id=487 bgcolor=#fefefe
| 172487 ||  || — || September 20, 2003 || Socorro || LINEAR || — || align=right | 1.5 km || 
|-id=488 bgcolor=#fefefe
| 172488 ||  || — || September 18, 2003 || Kitt Peak || Spacewatch || NYS || align=right data-sort-value="0.86" | 860 m || 
|-id=489 bgcolor=#fefefe
| 172489 ||  || — || September 20, 2003 || Palomar || NEAT || FLO || align=right | 1.3 km || 
|-id=490 bgcolor=#fefefe
| 172490 ||  || — || September 18, 2003 || Kitt Peak || Spacewatch || — || align=right | 1.1 km || 
|-id=491 bgcolor=#fefefe
| 172491 ||  || — || September 20, 2003 || Kitt Peak || Spacewatch || — || align=right | 1.4 km || 
|-id=492 bgcolor=#fefefe
| 172492 ||  || — || September 20, 2003 || Palomar || NEAT || — || align=right | 1.8 km || 
|-id=493 bgcolor=#fefefe
| 172493 ||  || — || September 17, 2003 || Socorro || LINEAR || — || align=right | 1.7 km || 
|-id=494 bgcolor=#fefefe
| 172494 ||  || — || September 17, 2003 || Socorro || LINEAR || V || align=right | 1.0 km || 
|-id=495 bgcolor=#fefefe
| 172495 ||  || — || September 19, 2003 || Anderson Mesa || LONEOS || V || align=right | 1.1 km || 
|-id=496 bgcolor=#fefefe
| 172496 ||  || — || September 20, 2003 || Anderson Mesa || LONEOS || — || align=right | 1.3 km || 
|-id=497 bgcolor=#fefefe
| 172497 ||  || — || September 23, 2003 || Haleakala || NEAT || — || align=right | 1.5 km || 
|-id=498 bgcolor=#fefefe
| 172498 ||  || — || September 23, 2003 || Haleakala || NEAT || — || align=right | 1.7 km || 
|-id=499 bgcolor=#fefefe
| 172499 ||  || — || September 23, 2003 || Haleakala || NEAT || — || align=right | 1.2 km || 
|-id=500 bgcolor=#fefefe
| 172500 ||  || — || September 18, 2003 || Campo Imperatore || CINEOS || V || align=right | 1.2 km || 
|}

172501–172600 

|-bgcolor=#fefefe
| 172501 ||  || — || September 19, 2003 || Socorro || LINEAR || — || align=right | 1.3 km || 
|-id=502 bgcolor=#fefefe
| 172502 ||  || — || September 20, 2003 || Socorro || LINEAR || V || align=right | 1.1 km || 
|-id=503 bgcolor=#fefefe
| 172503 ||  || — || September 21, 2003 || Kitt Peak || Spacewatch || FLO || align=right | 1.2 km || 
|-id=504 bgcolor=#fefefe
| 172504 ||  || — || September 17, 2003 || Kitt Peak || Spacewatch || — || align=right | 2.3 km || 
|-id=505 bgcolor=#fefefe
| 172505 Kimberlyespy ||  ||  || September 22, 2003 || Goodricke-Pigott || V. Reddy || FLO || align=right | 1.2 km || 
|-id=506 bgcolor=#fefefe
| 172506 ||  || — || September 22, 2003 || Kitt Peak || Spacewatch || — || align=right | 1.1 km || 
|-id=507 bgcolor=#fefefe
| 172507 ||  || — || September 23, 2003 || Palomar || NEAT || V || align=right | 1.1 km || 
|-id=508 bgcolor=#fefefe
| 172508 ||  || — || September 25, 2003 || Haleakala || NEAT || — || align=right | 2.5 km || 
|-id=509 bgcolor=#E9E9E9
| 172509 ||  || — || September 28, 2003 || Desert Eagle || W. K. Y. Yeung || — || align=right | 3.4 km || 
|-id=510 bgcolor=#fefefe
| 172510 ||  || — || September 28, 2003 || Goodricke-Pigott || R. A. Tucker || FLO || align=right | 2.9 km || 
|-id=511 bgcolor=#fefefe
| 172511 ||  || — || September 25, 2003 || Haleakala || NEAT || — || align=right | 1.5 km || 
|-id=512 bgcolor=#fefefe
| 172512 ||  || — || September 24, 2003 || Palomar || NEAT || — || align=right | 1.3 km || 
|-id=513 bgcolor=#fefefe
| 172513 ||  || — || September 27, 2003 || Kitt Peak || Spacewatch || — || align=right data-sort-value="0.91" | 910 m || 
|-id=514 bgcolor=#fefefe
| 172514 ||  || — || September 27, 2003 || Kitt Peak || Spacewatch || NYS || align=right data-sort-value="0.82" | 820 m || 
|-id=515 bgcolor=#fefefe
| 172515 ||  || — || September 26, 2003 || Socorro || LINEAR || MAS || align=right | 1.3 km || 
|-id=516 bgcolor=#fefefe
| 172516 ||  || — || September 26, 2003 || Socorro || LINEAR || MAS || align=right | 1.1 km || 
|-id=517 bgcolor=#fefefe
| 172517 ||  || — || September 26, 2003 || Socorro || LINEAR || — || align=right | 1.0 km || 
|-id=518 bgcolor=#fefefe
| 172518 ||  || — || September 26, 2003 || Socorro || LINEAR || NYS || align=right | 1.2 km || 
|-id=519 bgcolor=#fefefe
| 172519 ||  || — || September 27, 2003 || Kitt Peak || Spacewatch || NYS || align=right | 2.3 km || 
|-id=520 bgcolor=#fefefe
| 172520 ||  || — || September 27, 2003 || Socorro || LINEAR || — || align=right data-sort-value="0.94" | 940 m || 
|-id=521 bgcolor=#fefefe
| 172521 ||  || — || September 29, 2003 || Socorro || LINEAR || — || align=right data-sort-value="0.98" | 980 m || 
|-id=522 bgcolor=#fefefe
| 172522 ||  || — || September 28, 2003 || Goodricke-Pigott || R. A. Tucker || NYS || align=right data-sort-value="0.98" | 980 m || 
|-id=523 bgcolor=#fefefe
| 172523 ||  || — || September 30, 2003 || Desert Eagle || W. K. Y. Yeung || MAS || align=right | 1.1 km || 
|-id=524 bgcolor=#fefefe
| 172524 ||  || — || September 28, 2003 || Desert Eagle || W. K. Y. Yeung || MAS || align=right data-sort-value="0.96" | 960 m || 
|-id=525 bgcolor=#fefefe
| 172525 Adamblock ||  ||  || October 4, 2003 || Junk Bond || D. Healy || — || align=right | 2.2 km || 
|-id=526 bgcolor=#fefefe
| 172526 Carolinegarcia ||  ||  || October 4, 2003 || Goodricke-Pigott || V. Reddy || ERI || align=right | 2.6 km || 
|-id=527 bgcolor=#fefefe
| 172527 ||  || — || October 1, 2003 || Kitt Peak || Spacewatch || — || align=right | 1.4 km || 
|-id=528 bgcolor=#fefefe
| 172528 ||  || — || October 14, 2003 || Anderson Mesa || LONEOS || — || align=right | 1.8 km || 
|-id=529 bgcolor=#fefefe
| 172529 ||  || — || October 1, 2003 || Anderson Mesa || LONEOS || V || align=right | 1.1 km || 
|-id=530 bgcolor=#fefefe
| 172530 ||  || — || October 3, 2003 || Haleakala || NEAT || FLO || align=right | 1.7 km || 
|-id=531 bgcolor=#fefefe
| 172531 ||  || — || October 15, 2003 || Anderson Mesa || LONEOS || — || align=right | 3.3 km || 
|-id=532 bgcolor=#fefefe
| 172532 ||  || — || October 16, 2003 || Anderson Mesa || LONEOS || CHL || align=right | 3.4 km || 
|-id=533 bgcolor=#fefefe
| 172533 ||  || — || October 20, 2003 || Wrightwood || J. W. Young || MAS || align=right | 1.1 km || 
|-id=534 bgcolor=#fefefe
| 172534 ||  || — || October 20, 2003 || Socorro || LINEAR || — || align=right | 1.3 km || 
|-id=535 bgcolor=#fefefe
| 172535 ||  || — || October 21, 2003 || Kingsnake || J. V. McClusky || — || align=right | 2.1 km || 
|-id=536 bgcolor=#fefefe
| 172536 ||  || — || October 25, 2003 || Goodricke-Pigott || R. A. Tucker || — || align=right data-sort-value="0.98" | 980 m || 
|-id=537 bgcolor=#fefefe
| 172537 ||  || — || October 23, 2003 || Goodricke-Pigott || R. A. Tucker || slow || align=right | 1.2 km || 
|-id=538 bgcolor=#fefefe
| 172538 ||  || — || October 16, 2003 || Palomar || NEAT || V || align=right | 1.3 km || 
|-id=539 bgcolor=#fefefe
| 172539 ||  || — || October 17, 2003 || Campo Imperatore || CINEOS || V || align=right | 1.3 km || 
|-id=540 bgcolor=#fefefe
| 172540 ||  || — || October 16, 2003 || Anderson Mesa || LONEOS || — || align=right | 1.6 km || 
|-id=541 bgcolor=#fefefe
| 172541 ||  || — || October 16, 2003 || Anderson Mesa || LONEOS || V || align=right | 1.1 km || 
|-id=542 bgcolor=#E9E9E9
| 172542 ||  || — || October 16, 2003 || Anderson Mesa || LONEOS || — || align=right | 1.3 km || 
|-id=543 bgcolor=#E9E9E9
| 172543 ||  || — || October 16, 2003 || Haleakala || NEAT || — || align=right | 1.5 km || 
|-id=544 bgcolor=#fefefe
| 172544 ||  || — || October 18, 2003 || Palomar || NEAT || — || align=right | 2.0 km || 
|-id=545 bgcolor=#fefefe
| 172545 ||  || — || October 18, 2003 || Palomar || NEAT || V || align=right | 1.1 km || 
|-id=546 bgcolor=#fefefe
| 172546 ||  || — || October 19, 2003 || Goodricke-Pigott || R. A. Tucker || — || align=right | 1.4 km || 
|-id=547 bgcolor=#fefefe
| 172547 ||  || — || October 16, 2003 || Palomar || NEAT || — || align=right | 1.5 km || 
|-id=548 bgcolor=#fefefe
| 172548 ||  || — || October 17, 2003 || Goodricke-Pigott || R. A. Tucker || — || align=right | 1.5 km || 
|-id=549 bgcolor=#E9E9E9
| 172549 ||  || — || October 19, 2003 || Anderson Mesa || LONEOS || — || align=right | 2.0 km || 
|-id=550 bgcolor=#fefefe
| 172550 ||  || — || October 20, 2003 || Kitt Peak || Spacewatch || — || align=right | 1.3 km || 
|-id=551 bgcolor=#E9E9E9
| 172551 ||  || — || October 18, 2003 || Kitt Peak || Spacewatch || MAR || align=right | 1.9 km || 
|-id=552 bgcolor=#fefefe
| 172552 ||  || — || October 18, 2003 || Kitt Peak || Spacewatch || — || align=right | 1.2 km || 
|-id=553 bgcolor=#fefefe
| 172553 ||  || — || October 20, 2003 || Palomar || NEAT || V || align=right | 1.1 km || 
|-id=554 bgcolor=#fefefe
| 172554 ||  || — || October 18, 2003 || Kitt Peak || Spacewatch || V || align=right data-sort-value="0.98" | 980 m || 
|-id=555 bgcolor=#E9E9E9
| 172555 ||  || — || October 19, 2003 || Palomar || NEAT || MAR || align=right | 1.4 km || 
|-id=556 bgcolor=#fefefe
| 172556 ||  || — || October 20, 2003 || Socorro || LINEAR || — || align=right | 1.5 km || 
|-id=557 bgcolor=#fefefe
| 172557 ||  || — || October 21, 2003 || Socorro || LINEAR || V || align=right | 1.1 km || 
|-id=558 bgcolor=#fefefe
| 172558 ||  || — || October 20, 2003 || Socorro || LINEAR || V || align=right | 1.1 km || 
|-id=559 bgcolor=#fefefe
| 172559 ||  || — || October 20, 2003 || Palomar || NEAT || — || align=right | 2.0 km || 
|-id=560 bgcolor=#fefefe
| 172560 ||  || — || October 20, 2003 || Palomar || NEAT || — || align=right | 1.4 km || 
|-id=561 bgcolor=#fefefe
| 172561 ||  || — || October 20, 2003 || Palomar || NEAT || V || align=right | 1.2 km || 
|-id=562 bgcolor=#E9E9E9
| 172562 ||  || — || October 18, 2003 || Anderson Mesa || LONEOS || — || align=right | 2.7 km || 
|-id=563 bgcolor=#E9E9E9
| 172563 ||  || — || October 20, 2003 || Socorro || LINEAR || — || align=right | 1.4 km || 
|-id=564 bgcolor=#E9E9E9
| 172564 ||  || — || October 21, 2003 || Palomar || NEAT || — || align=right | 1.5 km || 
|-id=565 bgcolor=#fefefe
| 172565 ||  || — || October 21, 2003 || Palomar || NEAT || NYS || align=right data-sort-value="0.63" | 630 m || 
|-id=566 bgcolor=#fefefe
| 172566 ||  || — || October 21, 2003 || Palomar || NEAT || — || align=right | 1.0 km || 
|-id=567 bgcolor=#fefefe
| 172567 ||  || — || October 22, 2003 || Socorro || LINEAR || — || align=right | 1.6 km || 
|-id=568 bgcolor=#fefefe
| 172568 ||  || — || October 19, 2003 || Kitt Peak || Spacewatch || — || align=right data-sort-value="0.97" | 970 m || 
|-id=569 bgcolor=#fefefe
| 172569 ||  || — || October 21, 2003 || Kitt Peak || Spacewatch || MAS || align=right data-sort-value="0.88" | 880 m || 
|-id=570 bgcolor=#fefefe
| 172570 ||  || — || October 21, 2003 || Palomar || NEAT || NYS || align=right data-sort-value="0.84" | 840 m || 
|-id=571 bgcolor=#fefefe
| 172571 ||  || — || October 21, 2003 || Socorro || LINEAR || FLO || align=right | 1.1 km || 
|-id=572 bgcolor=#fefefe
| 172572 ||  || — || October 22, 2003 || Kitt Peak || Spacewatch || — || align=right | 1.4 km || 
|-id=573 bgcolor=#fefefe
| 172573 ||  || — || October 21, 2003 || Socorro || LINEAR || MAS || align=right | 1.1 km || 
|-id=574 bgcolor=#fefefe
| 172574 ||  || — || October 22, 2003 || Socorro || LINEAR || — || align=right | 1.5 km || 
|-id=575 bgcolor=#fefefe
| 172575 ||  || — || October 22, 2003 || Socorro || LINEAR || — || align=right | 1.4 km || 
|-id=576 bgcolor=#fefefe
| 172576 ||  || — || October 23, 2003 || Anderson Mesa || LONEOS || — || align=right | 1.6 km || 
|-id=577 bgcolor=#fefefe
| 172577 ||  || — || October 24, 2003 || Socorro || LINEAR || MAS || align=right | 1.1 km || 
|-id=578 bgcolor=#fefefe
| 172578 ||  || — || October 24, 2003 || Socorro || LINEAR || — || align=right | 2.9 km || 
|-id=579 bgcolor=#E9E9E9
| 172579 ||  || — || October 25, 2003 || Socorro || LINEAR || — || align=right | 3.7 km || 
|-id=580 bgcolor=#fefefe
| 172580 ||  || — || October 25, 2003 || Socorro || LINEAR || — || align=right | 1.4 km || 
|-id=581 bgcolor=#fefefe
| 172581 ||  || — || October 25, 2003 || Socorro || LINEAR || V || align=right | 1.2 km || 
|-id=582 bgcolor=#fefefe
| 172582 ||  || — || October 26, 2003 || Catalina || CSS || NYS || align=right data-sort-value="0.96" | 960 m || 
|-id=583 bgcolor=#E9E9E9
| 172583 ||  || — || October 27, 2003 || Socorro || LINEAR || — || align=right | 1.4 km || 
|-id=584 bgcolor=#fefefe
| 172584 ||  || — || October 28, 2003 || Socorro || LINEAR || — || align=right | 3.5 km || 
|-id=585 bgcolor=#fefefe
| 172585 ||  || — || October 28, 2003 || Socorro || LINEAR || NYS || align=right data-sort-value="0.94" | 940 m || 
|-id=586 bgcolor=#fefefe
| 172586 ||  || — || October 30, 2003 || Socorro || LINEAR || V || align=right | 1.2 km || 
|-id=587 bgcolor=#E9E9E9
| 172587 ||  || — || October 29, 2003 || Catalina || CSS || GER || align=right | 2.3 km || 
|-id=588 bgcolor=#fefefe
| 172588 ||  || — || October 29, 2003 || Anderson Mesa || LONEOS || FLO || align=right | 1.0 km || 
|-id=589 bgcolor=#fefefe
| 172589 ||  || — || October 29, 2003 || Anderson Mesa || LONEOS || — || align=right | 1.6 km || 
|-id=590 bgcolor=#fefefe
| 172590 ||  || — || October 30, 2003 || Socorro || LINEAR || — || align=right | 1.4 km || 
|-id=591 bgcolor=#fefefe
| 172591 ||  || — || October 23, 2003 || Kitt Peak || Spacewatch || NYS || align=right data-sort-value="0.92" | 920 m || 
|-id=592 bgcolor=#fefefe
| 172592 ||  || — || October 16, 2003 || Kitt Peak || Spacewatch || — || align=right | 1.0 km || 
|-id=593 bgcolor=#E9E9E9
| 172593 Vörösmarty || 2003 VM ||  || November 5, 2003 || Piszkéstető || K. Sárneczky, S. Mészáros || — || align=right | 2.7 km || 
|-id=594 bgcolor=#fefefe
| 172594 ||  || — || November 16, 2003 || Kitt Peak || Spacewatch || V || align=right | 1.1 km || 
|-id=595 bgcolor=#fefefe
| 172595 ||  || — || November 18, 2003 || Palomar || NEAT || NYS || align=right data-sort-value="0.91" | 910 m || 
|-id=596 bgcolor=#fefefe
| 172596 ||  || — || November 19, 2003 || Socorro || LINEAR || V || align=right | 1.2 km || 
|-id=597 bgcolor=#E9E9E9
| 172597 ||  || — || November 16, 2003 || Kitt Peak || Spacewatch || — || align=right | 4.0 km || 
|-id=598 bgcolor=#fefefe
| 172598 ||  || — || November 18, 2003 || Palomar || NEAT || V || align=right | 1.2 km || 
|-id=599 bgcolor=#fefefe
| 172599 ||  || — || November 18, 2003 || Palomar || NEAT || V || align=right | 1.3 km || 
|-id=600 bgcolor=#E9E9E9
| 172600 ||  || — || November 19, 2003 || Catalina || CSS || — || align=right | 1.7 km || 
|}

172601–172700 

|-bgcolor=#fefefe
| 172601 ||  || — || November 18, 2003 || Palomar || NEAT || V || align=right data-sort-value="0.91" | 910 m || 
|-id=602 bgcolor=#fefefe
| 172602 ||  || — || November 19, 2003 || Kitt Peak || Spacewatch || — || align=right | 1.5 km || 
|-id=603 bgcolor=#fefefe
| 172603 ||  || — || November 20, 2003 || Socorro || LINEAR || — || align=right | 1.4 km || 
|-id=604 bgcolor=#fefefe
| 172604 ||  || — || November 19, 2003 || Socorro || LINEAR || V || align=right | 1.1 km || 
|-id=605 bgcolor=#E9E9E9
| 172605 ||  || — || November 20, 2003 || Socorro || LINEAR || — || align=right | 1.7 km || 
|-id=606 bgcolor=#fefefe
| 172606 ||  || — || November 20, 2003 || Socorro || LINEAR || NYS || align=right | 1.1 km || 
|-id=607 bgcolor=#E9E9E9
| 172607 ||  || — || November 21, 2003 || Socorro || LINEAR || — || align=right | 3.7 km || 
|-id=608 bgcolor=#E9E9E9
| 172608 ||  || — || November 20, 2003 || Socorro || LINEAR || EUN || align=right | 3.7 km || 
|-id=609 bgcolor=#fefefe
| 172609 ||  || — || November 21, 2003 || Socorro || LINEAR || — || align=right | 2.1 km || 
|-id=610 bgcolor=#E9E9E9
| 172610 ||  || — || November 19, 2003 || Anderson Mesa || LONEOS || — || align=right | 2.7 km || 
|-id=611 bgcolor=#E9E9E9
| 172611 ||  || — || November 20, 2003 || Socorro || LINEAR || BAR || align=right | 2.6 km || 
|-id=612 bgcolor=#E9E9E9
| 172612 ||  || — || November 20, 2003 || Palomar || NEAT || — || align=right | 2.0 km || 
|-id=613 bgcolor=#fefefe
| 172613 ||  || — || November 21, 2003 || Socorro || LINEAR || — || align=right | 1.3 km || 
|-id=614 bgcolor=#fefefe
| 172614 ||  || — || November 20, 2003 || Socorro || LINEAR || NYS || align=right | 2.3 km || 
|-id=615 bgcolor=#fefefe
| 172615 ||  || — || November 19, 2003 || Kitt Peak || Spacewatch || — || align=right | 1.4 km || 
|-id=616 bgcolor=#E9E9E9
| 172616 ||  || — || November 21, 2003 || Socorro || LINEAR || — || align=right | 1.7 km || 
|-id=617 bgcolor=#E9E9E9
| 172617 ||  || — || November 21, 2003 || Socorro || LINEAR || — || align=right | 1.7 km || 
|-id=618 bgcolor=#E9E9E9
| 172618 ||  || — || November 21, 2003 || Socorro || LINEAR || — || align=right | 3.4 km || 
|-id=619 bgcolor=#E9E9E9
| 172619 ||  || — || November 21, 2003 || Socorro || LINEAR || — || align=right | 1.8 km || 
|-id=620 bgcolor=#E9E9E9
| 172620 ||  || — || November 21, 2003 || Socorro || LINEAR || — || align=right | 2.3 km || 
|-id=621 bgcolor=#E9E9E9
| 172621 ||  || — || November 21, 2003 || Socorro || LINEAR || MAR || align=right | 2.5 km || 
|-id=622 bgcolor=#E9E9E9
| 172622 ||  || — || November 21, 2003 || Socorro || LINEAR || — || align=right | 3.1 km || 
|-id=623 bgcolor=#fefefe
| 172623 ||  || — || November 29, 2003 || Kitt Peak || Spacewatch || — || align=right | 1.2 km || 
|-id=624 bgcolor=#E9E9E9
| 172624 ||  || — || November 29, 2003 || Catalina || CSS || JUN || align=right | 4.7 km || 
|-id=625 bgcolor=#E9E9E9
| 172625 ||  || — || November 19, 2003 || Kitt Peak || Spacewatch || — || align=right | 2.5 km || 
|-id=626 bgcolor=#E9E9E9
| 172626 ||  || — || December 1, 2003 || Catalina || CSS || — || align=right | 2.4 km || 
|-id=627 bgcolor=#E9E9E9
| 172627 ||  || — || December 9, 2003 || Wrightwood || J. W. Young || — || align=right | 5.6 km || 
|-id=628 bgcolor=#fefefe
| 172628 ||  || — || December 14, 2003 || Palomar || NEAT || V || align=right | 1.3 km || 
|-id=629 bgcolor=#E9E9E9
| 172629 ||  || — || December 14, 2003 || Palomar || NEAT || — || align=right | 4.2 km || 
|-id=630 bgcolor=#E9E9E9
| 172630 ||  || — || December 15, 2003 || Kitt Peak || Spacewatch || — || align=right | 1.7 km || 
|-id=631 bgcolor=#E9E9E9
| 172631 ||  || — || December 14, 2003 || Kitt Peak || Spacewatch || — || align=right | 1.8 km || 
|-id=632 bgcolor=#E9E9E9
| 172632 ||  || — || December 1, 2003 || Kitt Peak || Spacewatch || — || align=right | 2.0 km || 
|-id=633 bgcolor=#fefefe
| 172633 ||  || — || December 20, 2003 || Nashville || R. Clingan || — || align=right | 1.3 km || 
|-id=634 bgcolor=#E9E9E9
| 172634 ||  || — || December 17, 2003 || Catalina || CSS || HNS || align=right | 2.1 km || 
|-id=635 bgcolor=#E9E9E9
| 172635 ||  || — || December 17, 2003 || Socorro || LINEAR || MIT || align=right | 4.9 km || 
|-id=636 bgcolor=#E9E9E9
| 172636 ||  || — || December 17, 2003 || Socorro || LINEAR || ADE || align=right | 4.2 km || 
|-id=637 bgcolor=#E9E9E9
| 172637 ||  || — || December 17, 2003 || Kitt Peak || Spacewatch || — || align=right | 3.2 km || 
|-id=638 bgcolor=#d6d6d6
| 172638 ||  || — || December 17, 2003 || Kitt Peak || Spacewatch || — || align=right | 4.8 km || 
|-id=639 bgcolor=#fefefe
| 172639 ||  || — || December 18, 2003 || Kitt Peak || Spacewatch || FLO || align=right data-sort-value="0.89" | 890 m || 
|-id=640 bgcolor=#fefefe
| 172640 ||  || — || December 20, 2003 || Socorro || LINEAR || — || align=right | 1.5 km || 
|-id=641 bgcolor=#E9E9E9
| 172641 ||  || — || December 17, 2003 || Socorro || LINEAR || — || align=right | 3.7 km || 
|-id=642 bgcolor=#E9E9E9
| 172642 ||  || — || December 17, 2003 || Kitt Peak || Spacewatch || — || align=right | 2.3 km || 
|-id=643 bgcolor=#E9E9E9
| 172643 ||  || — || December 18, 2003 || Socorro || LINEAR || — || align=right | 1.7 km || 
|-id=644 bgcolor=#E9E9E9
| 172644 ||  || — || December 18, 2003 || Socorro || LINEAR || — || align=right | 1.7 km || 
|-id=645 bgcolor=#fefefe
| 172645 ||  || — || December 19, 2003 || Socorro || LINEAR || — || align=right | 1.6 km || 
|-id=646 bgcolor=#E9E9E9
| 172646 ||  || — || December 19, 2003 || Socorro || LINEAR || — || align=right | 1.9 km || 
|-id=647 bgcolor=#fefefe
| 172647 ||  || — || December 19, 2003 || Socorro || LINEAR || — || align=right | 1.7 km || 
|-id=648 bgcolor=#fefefe
| 172648 ||  || — || December 19, 2003 || Socorro || LINEAR || NYS || align=right | 1.3 km || 
|-id=649 bgcolor=#E9E9E9
| 172649 ||  || — || December 19, 2003 || Socorro || LINEAR || MAR || align=right | 2.6 km || 
|-id=650 bgcolor=#E9E9E9
| 172650 ||  || — || December 20, 2003 || Haleakala || NEAT || — || align=right | 3.1 km || 
|-id=651 bgcolor=#E9E9E9
| 172651 ||  || — || December 18, 2003 || Socorro || LINEAR || — || align=right | 2.7 km || 
|-id=652 bgcolor=#fefefe
| 172652 ||  || — || December 18, 2003 || Socorro || LINEAR || — || align=right | 1.6 km || 
|-id=653 bgcolor=#E9E9E9
| 172653 ||  || — || December 18, 2003 || Socorro || LINEAR || — || align=right | 1.5 km || 
|-id=654 bgcolor=#E9E9E9
| 172654 ||  || — || December 18, 2003 || Socorro || LINEAR || — || align=right | 3.0 km || 
|-id=655 bgcolor=#E9E9E9
| 172655 ||  || — || December 18, 2003 || Socorro || LINEAR || — || align=right | 1.5 km || 
|-id=656 bgcolor=#E9E9E9
| 172656 ||  || — || December 18, 2003 || Socorro || LINEAR || — || align=right | 5.6 km || 
|-id=657 bgcolor=#E9E9E9
| 172657 ||  || — || December 18, 2003 || Socorro || LINEAR || — || align=right | 1.6 km || 
|-id=658 bgcolor=#E9E9E9
| 172658 ||  || — || December 19, 2003 || Socorro || LINEAR || HEN || align=right | 1.9 km || 
|-id=659 bgcolor=#fefefe
| 172659 ||  || — || December 21, 2003 || Socorro || LINEAR || NYS || align=right | 2.3 km || 
|-id=660 bgcolor=#E9E9E9
| 172660 ||  || — || December 21, 2003 || Kitt Peak || Spacewatch || — || align=right | 2.3 km || 
|-id=661 bgcolor=#fefefe
| 172661 ||  || — || December 19, 2003 || Socorro || LINEAR || — || align=right | 1.5 km || 
|-id=662 bgcolor=#E9E9E9
| 172662 ||  || — || December 19, 2003 || Socorro || LINEAR || — || align=right | 1.4 km || 
|-id=663 bgcolor=#E9E9E9
| 172663 ||  || — || December 19, 2003 || Socorro || LINEAR || EUN || align=right | 2.3 km || 
|-id=664 bgcolor=#E9E9E9
| 172664 ||  || — || December 19, 2003 || Socorro || LINEAR || — || align=right | 2.7 km || 
|-id=665 bgcolor=#E9E9E9
| 172665 ||  || — || December 19, 2003 || Socorro || LINEAR || HNS || align=right | 1.9 km || 
|-id=666 bgcolor=#E9E9E9
| 172666 ||  || — || December 23, 2003 || Socorro || LINEAR || — || align=right | 2.9 km || 
|-id=667 bgcolor=#E9E9E9
| 172667 ||  || — || December 24, 2003 || Socorro || LINEAR || — || align=right | 2.1 km || 
|-id=668 bgcolor=#E9E9E9
| 172668 ||  || — || December 27, 2003 || Socorro || LINEAR || RAF || align=right | 2.1 km || 
|-id=669 bgcolor=#E9E9E9
| 172669 ||  || — || December 27, 2003 || Kitt Peak || Spacewatch || — || align=right | 1.7 km || 
|-id=670 bgcolor=#E9E9E9
| 172670 ||  || — || December 27, 2003 || Socorro || LINEAR || — || align=right | 3.5 km || 
|-id=671 bgcolor=#E9E9E9
| 172671 ||  || — || December 27, 2003 || Socorro || LINEAR || — || align=right | 1.7 km || 
|-id=672 bgcolor=#E9E9E9
| 172672 ||  || — || December 27, 2003 || Socorro || LINEAR || — || align=right | 4.2 km || 
|-id=673 bgcolor=#E9E9E9
| 172673 ||  || — || December 27, 2003 || Socorro || LINEAR || EUN || align=right | 3.4 km || 
|-id=674 bgcolor=#E9E9E9
| 172674 ||  || — || December 28, 2003 || Socorro || LINEAR || — || align=right | 3.1 km || 
|-id=675 bgcolor=#E9E9E9
| 172675 ||  || — || December 28, 2003 || Socorro || LINEAR || — || align=right | 2.8 km || 
|-id=676 bgcolor=#fefefe
| 172676 ||  || — || December 30, 2003 || Sandlot || G. Hug || — || align=right | 3.0 km || 
|-id=677 bgcolor=#d6d6d6
| 172677 ||  || — || December 27, 2003 || Socorro || LINEAR || EOS || align=right | 4.0 km || 
|-id=678 bgcolor=#FFC2E0
| 172678 ||  || — || December 27, 2003 || Socorro || LINEAR || APOPHAcritical || align=right data-sort-value="0.65" | 650 m || 
|-id=679 bgcolor=#E9E9E9
| 172679 ||  || — || December 27, 2003 || Kitt Peak || Spacewatch || — || align=right | 2.3 km || 
|-id=680 bgcolor=#E9E9E9
| 172680 ||  || — || December 27, 2003 || Socorro || LINEAR || NEM || align=right | 4.0 km || 
|-id=681 bgcolor=#E9E9E9
| 172681 ||  || — || December 28, 2003 || Socorro || LINEAR || — || align=right | 1.9 km || 
|-id=682 bgcolor=#E9E9E9
| 172682 ||  || — || December 29, 2003 || Socorro || LINEAR || JUN || align=right | 1.9 km || 
|-id=683 bgcolor=#E9E9E9
| 172683 ||  || — || December 29, 2003 || Socorro || LINEAR || — || align=right | 2.7 km || 
|-id=684 bgcolor=#E9E9E9
| 172684 ||  || — || December 29, 2003 || Socorro || LINEAR || — || align=right | 3.9 km || 
|-id=685 bgcolor=#E9E9E9
| 172685 ||  || — || December 30, 2003 || Socorro || LINEAR || — || align=right | 3.3 km || 
|-id=686 bgcolor=#E9E9E9
| 172686 ||  || — || December 26, 2003 || Haleakala || NEAT || — || align=right | 2.1 km || 
|-id=687 bgcolor=#E9E9E9
| 172687 ||  || — || December 17, 2003 || Socorro || LINEAR || ADE || align=right | 3.9 km || 
|-id=688 bgcolor=#E9E9E9
| 172688 ||  || — || December 17, 2003 || Kitt Peak || Spacewatch || — || align=right | 1.5 km || 
|-id=689 bgcolor=#fefefe
| 172689 ||  || — || December 18, 2003 || Socorro || LINEAR || — || align=right | 1.6 km || 
|-id=690 bgcolor=#E9E9E9
| 172690 ||  || — || December 19, 2003 || Kitt Peak || Spacewatch || — || align=right | 2.5 km || 
|-id=691 bgcolor=#E9E9E9
| 172691 ||  || — || December 19, 2003 || Kitt Peak || Spacewatch || — || align=right | 1.9 km || 
|-id=692 bgcolor=#E9E9E9
| 172692 ||  || — || January 13, 2004 || Anderson Mesa || LONEOS || JUN || align=right | 1.7 km || 
|-id=693 bgcolor=#d6d6d6
| 172693 ||  || — || January 13, 2004 || Palomar || NEAT || — || align=right | 4.7 km || 
|-id=694 bgcolor=#E9E9E9
| 172694 ||  || — || January 13, 2004 || Anderson Mesa || LONEOS || — || align=right | 2.3 km || 
|-id=695 bgcolor=#E9E9E9
| 172695 ||  || — || January 16, 2004 || Kitt Peak || Spacewatch || PAD || align=right | 2.5 km || 
|-id=696 bgcolor=#E9E9E9
| 172696 ||  || — || January 16, 2004 || Kitt Peak || Spacewatch || — || align=right | 3.0 km || 
|-id=697 bgcolor=#E9E9E9
| 172697 ||  || — || January 16, 2004 || Palomar || NEAT || — || align=right | 1.3 km || 
|-id=698 bgcolor=#E9E9E9
| 172698 ||  || — || January 16, 2004 || Kitt Peak || Spacewatch || — || align=right | 1.3 km || 
|-id=699 bgcolor=#E9E9E9
| 172699 ||  || — || January 18, 2004 || Palomar || NEAT || — || align=right | 4.2 km || 
|-id=700 bgcolor=#E9E9E9
| 172700 ||  || — || January 19, 2004 || Anderson Mesa || LONEOS || — || align=right | 2.0 km || 
|}

172701–172800 

|-bgcolor=#E9E9E9
| 172701 ||  || — || January 19, 2004 || Catalina || CSS || — || align=right | 2.6 km || 
|-id=702 bgcolor=#E9E9E9
| 172702 ||  || — || January 18, 2004 || Palomar || NEAT || — || align=right | 1.6 km || 
|-id=703 bgcolor=#E9E9E9
| 172703 ||  || — || January 18, 2004 || Palomar || NEAT || NEM || align=right | 3.5 km || 
|-id=704 bgcolor=#E9E9E9
| 172704 ||  || — || January 19, 2004 || Anderson Mesa || LONEOS || — || align=right | 2.4 km || 
|-id=705 bgcolor=#d6d6d6
| 172705 ||  || — || January 19, 2004 || Kitt Peak || Spacewatch || KOR || align=right | 1.8 km || 
|-id=706 bgcolor=#d6d6d6
| 172706 ||  || — || January 19, 2004 || Kitt Peak || Spacewatch || KOR || align=right | 2.3 km || 
|-id=707 bgcolor=#E9E9E9
| 172707 ||  || — || January 22, 2004 || Socorro || LINEAR || AGN || align=right | 2.3 km || 
|-id=708 bgcolor=#E9E9E9
| 172708 ||  || — || January 21, 2004 || Socorro || LINEAR || ADE || align=right | 5.1 km || 
|-id=709 bgcolor=#E9E9E9
| 172709 ||  || — || January 21, 2004 || Socorro || LINEAR || — || align=right | 3.7 km || 
|-id=710 bgcolor=#E9E9E9
| 172710 ||  || — || January 21, 2004 || Socorro || LINEAR || MRX || align=right | 1.2 km || 
|-id=711 bgcolor=#E9E9E9
| 172711 ||  || — || January 22, 2004 || Socorro || LINEAR || MAR || align=right | 1.9 km || 
|-id=712 bgcolor=#d6d6d6
| 172712 ||  || — || January 23, 2004 || Anderson Mesa || LONEOS || — || align=right | 3.6 km || 
|-id=713 bgcolor=#E9E9E9
| 172713 ||  || — || January 21, 2004 || Socorro || LINEAR || — || align=right | 1.5 km || 
|-id=714 bgcolor=#E9E9E9
| 172714 ||  || — || January 22, 2004 || Socorro || LINEAR || AGN || align=right | 2.1 km || 
|-id=715 bgcolor=#E9E9E9
| 172715 ||  || — || January 24, 2004 || Socorro || LINEAR || — || align=right | 3.4 km || 
|-id=716 bgcolor=#E9E9E9
| 172716 ||  || — || January 22, 2004 || Socorro || LINEAR || HEN || align=right | 1.5 km || 
|-id=717 bgcolor=#E9E9E9
| 172717 ||  || — || January 26, 2004 || Anderson Mesa || LONEOS || WIT || align=right | 1.9 km || 
|-id=718 bgcolor=#FFC2E0
| 172718 ||  || — || January 28, 2004 || Socorro || LINEAR || AMO || align=right data-sort-value="0.63" | 630 m || 
|-id=719 bgcolor=#E9E9E9
| 172719 ||  || — || January 23, 2004 || Socorro || LINEAR || — || align=right | 5.0 km || 
|-id=720 bgcolor=#E9E9E9
| 172720 ||  || — || January 28, 2004 || Socorro || LINEAR || HNS || align=right | 2.4 km || 
|-id=721 bgcolor=#E9E9E9
| 172721 ||  || — || January 28, 2004 || Kitt Peak || Spacewatch || — || align=right | 2.9 km || 
|-id=722 bgcolor=#FFC2E0
| 172722 ||  || — || January 31, 2004 || Socorro || LINEAR || APO +1km || align=right | 1.1 km || 
|-id=723 bgcolor=#E9E9E9
| 172723 ||  || — || January 28, 2004 || Catalina || CSS || — || align=right | 1.9 km || 
|-id=724 bgcolor=#E9E9E9
| 172724 ||  || — || January 29, 2004 || Catalina || CSS || JUN || align=right | 1.9 km || 
|-id=725 bgcolor=#E9E9E9
| 172725 ||  || — || January 24, 2004 || Socorro || LINEAR || — || align=right | 1.4 km || 
|-id=726 bgcolor=#E9E9E9
| 172726 ||  || — || January 29, 2004 || Anderson Mesa || LONEOS || — || align=right | 1.6 km || 
|-id=727 bgcolor=#E9E9E9
| 172727 ||  || — || January 29, 2004 || Socorro || LINEAR || — || align=right | 1.8 km || 
|-id=728 bgcolor=#E9E9E9
| 172728 ||  || — || January 30, 2004 || Catalina || CSS || — || align=right | 2.9 km || 
|-id=729 bgcolor=#E9E9E9
| 172729 ||  || — || January 30, 2004 || Kitt Peak || Spacewatch || — || align=right | 3.6 km || 
|-id=730 bgcolor=#E9E9E9
| 172730 ||  || — || January 31, 2004 || Anderson Mesa || LONEOS || — || align=right | 2.7 km || 
|-id=731 bgcolor=#E9E9E9
| 172731 ||  || — || January 31, 2004 || Socorro || LINEAR || — || align=right | 4.1 km || 
|-id=732 bgcolor=#E9E9E9
| 172732 ||  || — || January 31, 2004 || Socorro || LINEAR || MAR || align=right | 2.2 km || 
|-id=733 bgcolor=#d6d6d6
| 172733 ||  || — || January 18, 2004 || Kitt Peak || Spacewatch || ANF || align=right | 1.9 km || 
|-id=734 bgcolor=#E9E9E9
| 172734 Giansimon ||  ||  || February 10, 2004 || San Marcello || L. Tesi, G. Fagioli || — || align=right | 2.0 km || 
|-id=735 bgcolor=#E9E9E9
| 172735 ||  || — || February 9, 2004 || Palomar || NEAT || — || align=right | 4.8 km || 
|-id=736 bgcolor=#E9E9E9
| 172736 ||  || — || February 10, 2004 || Palomar || NEAT || RAF || align=right | 1.4 km || 
|-id=737 bgcolor=#d6d6d6
| 172737 ||  || — || February 11, 2004 || Kitt Peak || Spacewatch || — || align=right | 3.0 km || 
|-id=738 bgcolor=#d6d6d6
| 172738 ||  || — || February 11, 2004 || Catalina || CSS || — || align=right | 3.4 km || 
|-id=739 bgcolor=#E9E9E9
| 172739 ||  || — || February 12, 2004 || Kitt Peak || Spacewatch || — || align=right | 3.5 km || 
|-id=740 bgcolor=#E9E9E9
| 172740 ||  || — || February 12, 2004 || Kitt Peak || Spacewatch || HOF || align=right | 4.1 km || 
|-id=741 bgcolor=#E9E9E9
| 172741 ||  || — || February 11, 2004 || Kitt Peak || Spacewatch || — || align=right | 2.9 km || 
|-id=742 bgcolor=#E9E9E9
| 172742 ||  || — || February 15, 2004 || Socorro || LINEAR || WIT || align=right | 1.7 km || 
|-id=743 bgcolor=#E9E9E9
| 172743 ||  || — || February 11, 2004 || Kitt Peak || Spacewatch || MRX || align=right | 1.7 km || 
|-id=744 bgcolor=#d6d6d6
| 172744 ||  || — || February 11, 2004 || Palomar || NEAT || — || align=right | 3.6 km || 
|-id=745 bgcolor=#E9E9E9
| 172745 ||  || — || February 12, 2004 || Kitt Peak || Spacewatch || — || align=right | 2.1 km || 
|-id=746 bgcolor=#d6d6d6
| 172746 ||  || — || February 14, 2004 || Kitt Peak || Spacewatch || KOR || align=right | 2.3 km || 
|-id=747 bgcolor=#E9E9E9
| 172747 ||  || — || February 11, 2004 || Kitt Peak || Spacewatch || — || align=right | 3.0 km || 
|-id=748 bgcolor=#E9E9E9
| 172748 ||  || — || February 12, 2004 || Palomar || NEAT || — || align=right | 3.8 km || 
|-id=749 bgcolor=#E9E9E9
| 172749 ||  || — || February 14, 2004 || Socorro || LINEAR || — || align=right | 3.8 km || 
|-id=750 bgcolor=#E9E9E9
| 172750 ||  || — || February 14, 2004 || Socorro || LINEAR || — || align=right | 3.0 km || 
|-id=751 bgcolor=#d6d6d6
| 172751 ||  || — || February 15, 2004 || Catalina || CSS || — || align=right | 4.6 km || 
|-id=752 bgcolor=#E9E9E9
| 172752 ||  || — || February 15, 2004 || Socorro || LINEAR || — || align=right | 2.4 km || 
|-id=753 bgcolor=#E9E9E9
| 172753 ||  || — || February 11, 2004 || Palomar || NEAT || AGN || align=right | 1.9 km || 
|-id=754 bgcolor=#d6d6d6
| 172754 || 2004 DM || — || February 16, 2004 || Desert Eagle || W. K. Y. Yeung || TRE || align=right | 4.4 km || 
|-id=755 bgcolor=#d6d6d6
| 172755 ||  || — || February 16, 2004 || Kitt Peak || Spacewatch || — || align=right | 4.8 km || 
|-id=756 bgcolor=#E9E9E9
| 172756 ||  || — || February 17, 2004 || Haleakala || NEAT || — || align=right | 3.9 km || 
|-id=757 bgcolor=#E9E9E9
| 172757 ||  || — || February 16, 2004 || Catalina || CSS || — || align=right | 3.9 km || 
|-id=758 bgcolor=#E9E9E9
| 172758 ||  || — || February 18, 2004 || Socorro || LINEAR || — || align=right | 2.3 km || 
|-id=759 bgcolor=#E9E9E9
| 172759 ||  || — || February 18, 2004 || Catalina || CSS || — || align=right | 2.9 km || 
|-id=760 bgcolor=#d6d6d6
| 172760 ||  || — || February 18, 2004 || Catalina || CSS || EOS || align=right | 3.4 km || 
|-id=761 bgcolor=#d6d6d6
| 172761 ||  || — || February 19, 2004 || Socorro || LINEAR || — || align=right | 7.3 km || 
|-id=762 bgcolor=#E9E9E9
| 172762 ||  || — || February 22, 2004 || Great Shefford || Great Shefford Obs. || — || align=right | 3.6 km || 
|-id=763 bgcolor=#d6d6d6
| 172763 ||  || — || February 18, 2004 || Socorro || LINEAR || — || align=right | 3.1 km || 
|-id=764 bgcolor=#d6d6d6
| 172764 ||  || — || February 23, 2004 || Socorro || LINEAR || — || align=right | 3.9 km || 
|-id=765 bgcolor=#d6d6d6
| 172765 ||  || — || February 23, 2004 || Socorro || LINEAR || — || align=right | 3.8 km || 
|-id=766 bgcolor=#d6d6d6
| 172766 ||  || — || February 22, 2004 || Kitt Peak || Spacewatch || — || align=right | 3.0 km || 
|-id=767 bgcolor=#d6d6d6
| 172767 ||  || — || February 26, 2004 || Socorro || LINEAR || HYG || align=right | 3.7 km || 
|-id=768 bgcolor=#E9E9E9
| 172768 ||  || — || February 26, 2004 || Socorro || LINEAR || — || align=right | 2.2 km || 
|-id=769 bgcolor=#d6d6d6
| 172769 ||  || — || February 17, 2004 || Socorro || LINEAR || — || align=right | 2.7 km || 
|-id=770 bgcolor=#E9E9E9
| 172770 ||  || — || March 9, 2004 || Palomar || NEAT || ADE || align=right | 4.2 km || 
|-id=771 bgcolor=#E9E9E9
| 172771 ||  || — || March 10, 2004 || Palomar || NEAT || RAF || align=right | 1.6 km || 
|-id=772 bgcolor=#d6d6d6
| 172772 ||  || — || March 11, 2004 || Palomar || NEAT || — || align=right | 5.6 km || 
|-id=773 bgcolor=#E9E9E9
| 172773 ||  || — || March 12, 2004 || Palomar || NEAT || — || align=right | 3.4 km || 
|-id=774 bgcolor=#E9E9E9
| 172774 ||  || — || March 15, 2004 || Palomar || NEAT || BAR || align=right | 2.7 km || 
|-id=775 bgcolor=#E9E9E9
| 172775 ||  || — || March 15, 2004 || Catalina || CSS || — || align=right | 3.2 km || 
|-id=776 bgcolor=#E9E9E9
| 172776 ||  || — || March 14, 2004 || Palomar || NEAT || DOR || align=right | 4.2 km || 
|-id=777 bgcolor=#d6d6d6
| 172777 ||  || — || March 15, 2004 || Palomar || NEAT || — || align=right | 6.9 km || 
|-id=778 bgcolor=#d6d6d6
| 172778 ||  || — || March 14, 2004 || Socorro || LINEAR || — || align=right | 3.8 km || 
|-id=779 bgcolor=#d6d6d6
| 172779 ||  || — || March 14, 2004 || Socorro || LINEAR || NAE || align=right | 5.3 km || 
|-id=780 bgcolor=#E9E9E9
| 172780 ||  || — || March 14, 2004 || Kitt Peak || Spacewatch || — || align=right | 2.5 km || 
|-id=781 bgcolor=#E9E9E9
| 172781 ||  || — || March 14, 2004 || Palomar || NEAT || MRX || align=right | 2.0 km || 
|-id=782 bgcolor=#d6d6d6
| 172782 ||  || — || March 15, 2004 || Kitt Peak || Spacewatch || THM || align=right | 4.5 km || 
|-id=783 bgcolor=#d6d6d6
| 172783 ||  || — || March 14, 2004 || Socorro || LINEAR || EOS || align=right | 3.5 km || 
|-id=784 bgcolor=#d6d6d6
| 172784 ||  || — || March 14, 2004 || Palomar || NEAT || — || align=right | 6.7 km || 
|-id=785 bgcolor=#d6d6d6
| 172785 ||  || — || March 11, 2004 || Palomar || NEAT || — || align=right | 2.5 km || 
|-id=786 bgcolor=#E9E9E9
| 172786 ||  || — || March 16, 2004 || Catalina || CSS || — || align=right | 2.6 km || 
|-id=787 bgcolor=#E9E9E9
| 172787 ||  || — || March 16, 2004 || Siding Spring || SSS || INO || align=right | 2.2 km || 
|-id=788 bgcolor=#d6d6d6
| 172788 ||  || — || March 23, 2004 || Goodricke-Pigott || Goodricke-Pigott Obs. || — || align=right | 5.1 km || 
|-id=789 bgcolor=#d6d6d6
| 172789 ||  || — || March 30, 2004 || Socorro || LINEAR || — || align=right | 7.8 km || 
|-id=790 bgcolor=#E9E9E9
| 172790 ||  || — || March 16, 2004 || Socorro || LINEAR || — || align=right | 2.2 km || 
|-id=791 bgcolor=#E9E9E9
| 172791 ||  || — || March 16, 2004 || Socorro || LINEAR || — || align=right | 4.0 km || 
|-id=792 bgcolor=#d6d6d6
| 172792 ||  || — || March 18, 2004 || Socorro || LINEAR || — || align=right | 3.9 km || 
|-id=793 bgcolor=#d6d6d6
| 172793 ||  || — || March 18, 2004 || Kitt Peak || Spacewatch || — || align=right | 3.7 km || 
|-id=794 bgcolor=#E9E9E9
| 172794 ||  || — || March 18, 2004 || Kitt Peak || Spacewatch || PAE || align=right | 4.6 km || 
|-id=795 bgcolor=#d6d6d6
| 172795 ||  || — || March 19, 2004 || Socorro || LINEAR || — || align=right | 4.0 km || 
|-id=796 bgcolor=#E9E9E9
| 172796 ||  || — || March 22, 2004 || Socorro || LINEAR || — || align=right | 3.3 km || 
|-id=797 bgcolor=#d6d6d6
| 172797 ||  || — || March 23, 2004 || Socorro || LINEAR || — || align=right | 3.6 km || 
|-id=798 bgcolor=#d6d6d6
| 172798 ||  || — || March 23, 2004 || Kitt Peak || Spacewatch || THM || align=right | 3.2 km || 
|-id=799 bgcolor=#d6d6d6
| 172799 ||  || — || March 26, 2004 || Kitt Peak || Spacewatch || KOR || align=right | 2.0 km || 
|-id=800 bgcolor=#E9E9E9
| 172800 ||  || — || March 26, 2004 || Socorro || LINEAR || — || align=right | 3.8 km || 
|}

172801–172900 

|-bgcolor=#d6d6d6
| 172801 ||  || — || March 19, 2004 || Socorro || LINEAR || — || align=right | 5.0 km || 
|-id=802 bgcolor=#d6d6d6
| 172802 ||  || — || March 23, 2004 || Kitt Peak || Spacewatch || — || align=right | 3.9 km || 
|-id=803 bgcolor=#E9E9E9
| 172803 ||  || — || March 20, 2004 || Anderson Mesa || LONEOS || DOR || align=right | 5.4 km || 
|-id=804 bgcolor=#E9E9E9
| 172804 ||  || — || March 28, 2004 || Socorro || LINEAR || — || align=right | 3.7 km || 
|-id=805 bgcolor=#d6d6d6
| 172805 ||  || — || March 17, 2004 || Kitt Peak || Spacewatch || — || align=right | 3.9 km || 
|-id=806 bgcolor=#d6d6d6
| 172806 ||  || — || April 13, 2004 || Kitt Peak || Spacewatch || BRA || align=right | 2.7 km || 
|-id=807 bgcolor=#d6d6d6
| 172807 ||  || — || April 10, 2004 || Palomar || NEAT || CHA || align=right | 3.7 km || 
|-id=808 bgcolor=#d6d6d6
| 172808 ||  || — || April 14, 2004 || Anderson Mesa || LONEOS || — || align=right | 5.0 km || 
|-id=809 bgcolor=#d6d6d6
| 172809 ||  || — || April 15, 2004 || Palomar || NEAT || — || align=right | 5.8 km || 
|-id=810 bgcolor=#d6d6d6
| 172810 ||  || — || April 12, 2004 || Palomar || NEAT || — || align=right | 4.2 km || 
|-id=811 bgcolor=#E9E9E9
| 172811 ||  || — || April 13, 2004 || Palomar || NEAT || — || align=right | 3.9 km || 
|-id=812 bgcolor=#d6d6d6
| 172812 ||  || — || April 15, 2004 || Catalina || CSS || EOS || align=right | 3.5 km || 
|-id=813 bgcolor=#d6d6d6
| 172813 ||  || — || April 13, 2004 || Kitt Peak || Spacewatch || — || align=right | 5.5 km || 
|-id=814 bgcolor=#d6d6d6
| 172814 ||  || — || April 13, 2004 || Kitt Peak || Spacewatch || — || align=right | 3.3 km || 
|-id=815 bgcolor=#d6d6d6
| 172815 ||  || — || April 13, 2004 || Siding Spring || SSS || — || align=right | 4.4 km || 
|-id=816 bgcolor=#d6d6d6
| 172816 ||  || — || April 20, 2004 || Desert Eagle || W. K. Y. Yeung || — || align=right | 3.4 km || 
|-id=817 bgcolor=#E9E9E9
| 172817 ||  || — || April 21, 2004 || Socorro || LINEAR || AEO || align=right | 1.8 km || 
|-id=818 bgcolor=#d6d6d6
| 172818 ||  || — || April 24, 2004 || Kitt Peak || Spacewatch || 3:2 || align=right | 7.2 km || 
|-id=819 bgcolor=#C2FFFF
| 172819 ||  || — || May 15, 2004 || Socorro || LINEAR || L4 || align=right | 19 km || 
|-id=820 bgcolor=#fefefe
| 172820 ||  || — || September 6, 2004 || Socorro || LINEAR || H || align=right data-sort-value="0.91" | 910 m || 
|-id=821 bgcolor=#fefefe
| 172821 ||  || — || September 8, 2004 || Socorro || LINEAR || H || align=right | 1.1 km || 
|-id=822 bgcolor=#fefefe
| 172822 ||  || — || October 6, 2004 || Palomar || NEAT || H || align=right | 1.0 km || 
|-id=823 bgcolor=#fefefe
| 172823 ||  || — || October 7, 2004 || Kitt Peak || Spacewatch || — || align=right | 1.1 km || 
|-id=824 bgcolor=#fefefe
| 172824 || 2004 XA || — || December 1, 2004 || Socorro || LINEAR || H || align=right | 1.7 km || 
|-id=825 bgcolor=#fefefe
| 172825 ||  || — || December 18, 2004 || Mount Lemmon || Mount Lemmon Survey || — || align=right data-sort-value="0.94" | 940 m || 
|-id=826 bgcolor=#fefefe
| 172826 ||  || — || December 19, 2004 || Kitt Peak || Spacewatch || — || align=right | 1.5 km || 
|-id=827 bgcolor=#fefefe
| 172827 ||  || — || January 1, 2005 || Catalina || CSS || FLO || align=right data-sort-value="0.98" | 980 m || 
|-id=828 bgcolor=#fefefe
| 172828 ||  || — || January 7, 2005 || Catalina || CSS || — || align=right | 1.3 km || 
|-id=829 bgcolor=#fefefe
| 172829 ||  || — || January 7, 2005 || Socorro || LINEAR || — || align=right | 1.4 km || 
|-id=830 bgcolor=#fefefe
| 172830 ||  || — || January 7, 2005 || Catalina || CSS || ERI || align=right | 3.1 km || 
|-id=831 bgcolor=#fefefe
| 172831 ||  || — || February 1, 2005 || Kitt Peak || Spacewatch || — || align=right | 1.5 km || 
|-id=832 bgcolor=#fefefe
| 172832 ||  || — || February 1, 2005 || Kitt Peak || Spacewatch || NYS || align=right | 2.3 km || 
|-id=833 bgcolor=#fefefe
| 172833 ||  || — || February 1, 2005 || Catalina || CSS || NYS || align=right data-sort-value="0.91" | 910 m || 
|-id=834 bgcolor=#fefefe
| 172834 ||  || — || February 2, 2005 || Catalina || CSS || SUL || align=right | 3.0 km || 
|-id=835 bgcolor=#fefefe
| 172835 ||  || — || February 3, 2005 || Socorro || LINEAR || MAS || align=right | 1.1 km || 
|-id=836 bgcolor=#fefefe
| 172836 ||  || — || February 7, 2005 || Gnosca || S. Sposetti || — || align=right data-sort-value="0.98" | 980 m || 
|-id=837 bgcolor=#fefefe
| 172837 ||  || — || February 2, 2005 || Catalina || CSS || — || align=right | 1.5 km || 
|-id=838 bgcolor=#fefefe
| 172838 ||  || — || February 2, 2005 || Socorro || LINEAR || — || align=right | 1.0 km || 
|-id=839 bgcolor=#fefefe
| 172839 ||  || — || February 1, 2005 || Kitt Peak || Spacewatch || NYS || align=right | 2.5 km || 
|-id=840 bgcolor=#fefefe
| 172840 ||  || — || March 1, 2005 || Kitt Peak || Spacewatch || — || align=right | 2.2 km || 
|-id=841 bgcolor=#fefefe
| 172841 ||  || — || March 1, 2005 || Kitt Peak || Spacewatch || V || align=right data-sort-value="0.89" | 890 m || 
|-id=842 bgcolor=#fefefe
| 172842 ||  || — || March 2, 2005 || Kitt Peak || Spacewatch || — || align=right | 1.4 km || 
|-id=843 bgcolor=#fefefe
| 172843 ||  || — || March 2, 2005 || Kitt Peak || Spacewatch || — || align=right | 1.1 km || 
|-id=844 bgcolor=#E9E9E9
| 172844 ||  || — || March 2, 2005 || Kitt Peak || Spacewatch || — || align=right | 1.5 km || 
|-id=845 bgcolor=#fefefe
| 172845 ||  || — || March 2, 2005 || Catalina || CSS || FLO || align=right | 1.0 km || 
|-id=846 bgcolor=#E9E9E9
| 172846 ||  || — || March 3, 2005 || Kitt Peak || Spacewatch || — || align=right | 2.5 km || 
|-id=847 bgcolor=#fefefe
| 172847 ||  || — || March 3, 2005 || Kitt Peak || Spacewatch || FLO || align=right | 1.0 km || 
|-id=848 bgcolor=#fefefe
| 172848 ||  || — || March 3, 2005 || Kitt Peak || Spacewatch || NYS || align=right data-sort-value="0.90" | 900 m || 
|-id=849 bgcolor=#fefefe
| 172849 ||  || — || March 3, 2005 || Catalina || CSS || NYS || align=right | 1.1 km || 
|-id=850 bgcolor=#E9E9E9
| 172850 Coppens ||  ||  || March 3, 2005 || Tenagra II || J.-C. Merlin || — || align=right | 2.6 km || 
|-id=851 bgcolor=#fefefe
| 172851 ||  || — || March 3, 2005 || Catalina || CSS || NYS || align=right | 1.0 km || 
|-id=852 bgcolor=#fefefe
| 172852 ||  || — || March 7, 2005 || RAS || A. Lowe || — || align=right data-sort-value="0.99" | 990 m || 
|-id=853 bgcolor=#fefefe
| 172853 ||  || — || March 4, 2005 || Mount Lemmon || Mount Lemmon Survey || — || align=right data-sort-value="0.98" | 980 m || 
|-id=854 bgcolor=#E9E9E9
| 172854 ||  || — || March 3, 2005 || Kitt Peak || Spacewatch || — || align=right | 1.4 km || 
|-id=855 bgcolor=#fefefe
| 172855 ||  || — || March 3, 2005 || Catalina || CSS || — || align=right | 1.0 km || 
|-id=856 bgcolor=#fefefe
| 172856 ||  || — || March 3, 2005 || Catalina || CSS || — || align=right | 1.3 km || 
|-id=857 bgcolor=#fefefe
| 172857 ||  || — || March 3, 2005 || Catalina || CSS || NYS || align=right | 1.0 km || 
|-id=858 bgcolor=#fefefe
| 172858 ||  || — || March 7, 2005 || Socorro || LINEAR || — || align=right | 1.4 km || 
|-id=859 bgcolor=#E9E9E9
| 172859 ||  || — || March 3, 2005 || Kitt Peak || Spacewatch || — || align=right | 2.2 km || 
|-id=860 bgcolor=#fefefe
| 172860 ||  || — || March 3, 2005 || Catalina || CSS || — || align=right | 1.4 km || 
|-id=861 bgcolor=#fefefe
| 172861 ||  || — || March 4, 2005 || Kitt Peak || Spacewatch || — || align=right data-sort-value="0.99" | 990 m || 
|-id=862 bgcolor=#E9E9E9
| 172862 ||  || — || March 4, 2005 || Kitt Peak || Spacewatch || — || align=right | 1.6 km || 
|-id=863 bgcolor=#fefefe
| 172863 ||  || — || March 4, 2005 || Catalina || CSS || — || align=right | 1.0 km || 
|-id=864 bgcolor=#fefefe
| 172864 ||  || — || March 4, 2005 || Socorro || LINEAR || — || align=right | 1.1 km || 
|-id=865 bgcolor=#E9E9E9
| 172865 ||  || — || March 3, 2005 || Catalina || CSS || — || align=right | 3.8 km || 
|-id=866 bgcolor=#fefefe
| 172866 ||  || — || March 3, 2005 || Catalina || CSS || V || align=right | 1.3 km || 
|-id=867 bgcolor=#fefefe
| 172867 ||  || — || March 7, 2005 || Socorro || LINEAR || — || align=right | 1.2 km || 
|-id=868 bgcolor=#fefefe
| 172868 ||  || — || March 8, 2005 || Socorro || LINEAR || — || align=right | 1.1 km || 
|-id=869 bgcolor=#E9E9E9
| 172869 ||  || — || March 8, 2005 || Socorro || LINEAR || MAR || align=right | 1.8 km || 
|-id=870 bgcolor=#E9E9E9
| 172870 ||  || — || March 9, 2005 || Anderson Mesa || LONEOS || — || align=right | 2.0 km || 
|-id=871 bgcolor=#E9E9E9
| 172871 ||  || — || March 9, 2005 || Mount Lemmon || Mount Lemmon Survey || — || align=right | 2.5 km || 
|-id=872 bgcolor=#E9E9E9
| 172872 ||  || — || March 9, 2005 || Mount Lemmon || Mount Lemmon Survey || — || align=right | 2.3 km || 
|-id=873 bgcolor=#fefefe
| 172873 ||  || — || March 10, 2005 || Catalina || CSS || NYS || align=right | 1.0 km || 
|-id=874 bgcolor=#d6d6d6
| 172874 ||  || — || March 9, 2005 || Mount Lemmon || Mount Lemmon Survey || — || align=right | 3.2 km || 
|-id=875 bgcolor=#E9E9E9
| 172875 ||  || — || March 11, 2005 || Kitt Peak || Spacewatch || AST || align=right | 3.1 km || 
|-id=876 bgcolor=#E9E9E9
| 172876 ||  || — || March 11, 2005 || Mount Lemmon || Mount Lemmon Survey || HEN || align=right | 1.4 km || 
|-id=877 bgcolor=#fefefe
| 172877 ||  || — || March 8, 2005 || Kitt Peak || Spacewatch || — || align=right | 1.5 km || 
|-id=878 bgcolor=#fefefe
| 172878 ||  || — || March 8, 2005 || Kitt Peak || Spacewatch || NYS || align=right | 1.5 km || 
|-id=879 bgcolor=#E9E9E9
| 172879 ||  || — || March 11, 2005 || Socorro || LINEAR || — || align=right | 1.2 km || 
|-id=880 bgcolor=#fefefe
| 172880 ||  || — || March 11, 2005 || Mount Lemmon || Mount Lemmon Survey || NYS || align=right data-sort-value="0.80" | 800 m || 
|-id=881 bgcolor=#fefefe
| 172881 ||  || — || March 12, 2005 || Kitt Peak || Spacewatch || — || align=right | 1.4 km || 
|-id=882 bgcolor=#fefefe
| 172882 ||  || — || March 11, 2005 || Mount Lemmon || Mount Lemmon Survey || — || align=right data-sort-value="0.96" | 960 m || 
|-id=883 bgcolor=#fefefe
| 172883 ||  || — || March 11, 2005 || Anderson Mesa || LONEOS || — || align=right | 3.6 km || 
|-id=884 bgcolor=#fefefe
| 172884 ||  || — || March 11, 2005 || Anderson Mesa || LONEOS || — || align=right | 1.3 km || 
|-id=885 bgcolor=#fefefe
| 172885 ||  || — || March 15, 2005 || Mount Lemmon || Mount Lemmon Survey || — || align=right data-sort-value="0.87" | 870 m || 
|-id=886 bgcolor=#fefefe
| 172886 ||  || — || March 10, 2005 || Catalina || CSS || — || align=right | 1.5 km || 
|-id=887 bgcolor=#fefefe
| 172887 ||  || — || March 8, 2005 || Anderson Mesa || LONEOS || — || align=right data-sort-value="0.99" | 990 m || 
|-id=888 bgcolor=#d6d6d6
| 172888 ||  || — || March 9, 2005 || Kitt Peak || Spacewatch || — || align=right | 6.6 km || 
|-id=889 bgcolor=#E9E9E9
| 172889 ||  || — || March 10, 2005 || Catalina || CSS || — || align=right | 3.5 km || 
|-id=890 bgcolor=#fefefe
| 172890 ||  || — || March 30, 2005 || Catalina || CSS || — || align=right | 1.4 km || 
|-id=891 bgcolor=#fefefe
| 172891 ||  || — || April 1, 2005 || Anderson Mesa || LONEOS || — || align=right | 1.4 km || 
|-id=892 bgcolor=#E9E9E9
| 172892 ||  || — || April 1, 2005 || Kitt Peak || Spacewatch || NEM || align=right | 3.8 km || 
|-id=893 bgcolor=#E9E9E9
| 172893 ||  || — || April 2, 2005 || Bergisch Gladbach || W. Bickel || MAR || align=right | 2.7 km || 
|-id=894 bgcolor=#E9E9E9
| 172894 ||  || — || April 2, 2005 || Goodricke-Pigott || R. A. Tucker || — || align=right | 2.7 km || 
|-id=895 bgcolor=#fefefe
| 172895 ||  || — || April 3, 2005 || Palomar || NEAT || — || align=right | 1.4 km || 
|-id=896 bgcolor=#E9E9E9
| 172896 ||  || — || April 4, 2005 || Catalina || CSS || — || align=right | 1.5 km || 
|-id=897 bgcolor=#E9E9E9
| 172897 ||  || — || April 4, 2005 || Catalina || CSS || — || align=right | 3.6 km || 
|-id=898 bgcolor=#E9E9E9
| 172898 ||  || — || April 2, 2005 || Catalina || CSS || — || align=right | 3.1 km || 
|-id=899 bgcolor=#E9E9E9
| 172899 ||  || — || April 5, 2005 || Palomar || NEAT || — || align=right | 4.3 km || 
|-id=900 bgcolor=#E9E9E9
| 172900 ||  || — || April 2, 2005 || Palomar || NEAT || — || align=right | 3.3 km || 
|}

172901–173000 

|-bgcolor=#E9E9E9
| 172901 ||  || — || April 2, 2005 || Mount Lemmon || Mount Lemmon Survey || NEM || align=right | 3.7 km || 
|-id=902 bgcolor=#fefefe
| 172902 ||  || — || April 5, 2005 || Mount Lemmon || Mount Lemmon Survey || MAS || align=right data-sort-value="0.92" | 920 m || 
|-id=903 bgcolor=#E9E9E9
| 172903 ||  || — || April 6, 2005 || Catalina || CSS || — || align=right | 3.8 km || 
|-id=904 bgcolor=#fefefe
| 172904 ||  || — || April 6, 2005 || Mount Lemmon || Mount Lemmon Survey || NYS || align=right data-sort-value="0.90" | 900 m || 
|-id=905 bgcolor=#fefefe
| 172905 ||  || — || April 7, 2005 || Anderson Mesa || LONEOS || — || align=right | 1.5 km || 
|-id=906 bgcolor=#fefefe
| 172906 ||  || — || April 7, 2005 || Anderson Mesa || LONEOS || — || align=right | 1.5 km || 
|-id=907 bgcolor=#fefefe
| 172907 ||  || — || April 6, 2005 || Catalina || CSS || V || align=right | 1.2 km || 
|-id=908 bgcolor=#E9E9E9
| 172908 ||  || — || April 6, 2005 || Mount Lemmon || Mount Lemmon Survey || HEN || align=right | 1.6 km || 
|-id=909 bgcolor=#E9E9E9
| 172909 ||  || — || April 6, 2005 || Kitt Peak || Spacewatch || — || align=right | 2.4 km || 
|-id=910 bgcolor=#fefefe
| 172910 ||  || — || April 6, 2005 || Kitt Peak || Spacewatch || MAS || align=right | 1.1 km || 
|-id=911 bgcolor=#E9E9E9
| 172911 ||  || — || April 7, 2005 || Kitt Peak || Spacewatch || — || align=right | 1.5 km || 
|-id=912 bgcolor=#E9E9E9
| 172912 ||  || — || April 7, 2005 || Kitt Peak || Spacewatch || — || align=right | 2.3 km || 
|-id=913 bgcolor=#E9E9E9
| 172913 ||  || — || April 7, 2005 || Kitt Peak || Spacewatch || — || align=right | 1.9 km || 
|-id=914 bgcolor=#E9E9E9
| 172914 ||  || — || April 9, 2005 || Mount Lemmon || Mount Lemmon Survey || — || align=right | 1.4 km || 
|-id=915 bgcolor=#E9E9E9
| 172915 ||  || — || April 10, 2005 || Kitt Peak || Spacewatch || — || align=right | 3.2 km || 
|-id=916 bgcolor=#E9E9E9
| 172916 ||  || — || April 6, 2005 || Kitt Peak || Spacewatch || — || align=right | 2.3 km || 
|-id=917 bgcolor=#E9E9E9
| 172917 ||  || — || April 9, 2005 || Kitt Peak || Spacewatch || AGN || align=right | 1.5 km || 
|-id=918 bgcolor=#E9E9E9
| 172918 ||  || — || April 10, 2005 || Kitt Peak || Spacewatch || — || align=right | 2.0 km || 
|-id=919 bgcolor=#E9E9E9
| 172919 ||  || — || April 10, 2005 || Kitt Peak || Spacewatch || — || align=right | 4.0 km || 
|-id=920 bgcolor=#E9E9E9
| 172920 ||  || — || April 12, 2005 || Kitt Peak || Spacewatch || — || align=right | 2.9 km || 
|-id=921 bgcolor=#d6d6d6
| 172921 ||  || — || April 12, 2005 || Kitt Peak || Spacewatch || — || align=right | 4.4 km || 
|-id=922 bgcolor=#E9E9E9
| 172922 ||  || — || April 12, 2005 || Kitt Peak || Spacewatch || WIT || align=right | 1.8 km || 
|-id=923 bgcolor=#E9E9E9
| 172923 ||  || — || April 13, 2005 || Socorro || LINEAR || — || align=right | 3.1 km || 
|-id=924 bgcolor=#d6d6d6
| 172924 ||  || — || April 10, 2005 || Kitt Peak || Spacewatch || HYG || align=right | 5.6 km || 
|-id=925 bgcolor=#d6d6d6
| 172925 ||  || — || April 10, 2005 || Mount Lemmon || Mount Lemmon Survey || KOR || align=right | 1.9 km || 
|-id=926 bgcolor=#E9E9E9
| 172926 ||  || — || April 10, 2005 || Mount Lemmon || Mount Lemmon Survey || — || align=right | 1.4 km || 
|-id=927 bgcolor=#E9E9E9
| 172927 ||  || — || April 11, 2005 || Kitt Peak || Spacewatch || HOF || align=right | 4.1 km || 
|-id=928 bgcolor=#E9E9E9
| 172928 ||  || — || April 12, 2005 || Kitt Peak || Spacewatch || MIS || align=right | 3.8 km || 
|-id=929 bgcolor=#E9E9E9
| 172929 ||  || — || April 12, 2005 || Socorro || LINEAR || — || align=right | 2.0 km || 
|-id=930 bgcolor=#E9E9E9
| 172930 ||  || — || April 18, 2005 || Socorro || LINEAR || — || align=right | 2.8 km || 
|-id=931 bgcolor=#E9E9E9
| 172931 ||  || — || April 28, 2005 || Reedy Creek || J. Broughton || — || align=right | 2.8 km || 
|-id=932 bgcolor=#E9E9E9
| 172932 Bachleitner || 2005 JC ||  || May 1, 2005 || Altschwendt || W. Ries || — || align=right | 1.6 km || 
|-id=933 bgcolor=#E9E9E9
| 172933 || 2005 JH || — || May 2, 2005 || Reedy Creek || J. Broughton || — || align=right | 2.5 km || 
|-id=934 bgcolor=#E9E9E9
| 172934 || 2005 JX || — || May 3, 2005 || Socorro || LINEAR || — || align=right | 4.0 km || 
|-id=935 bgcolor=#E9E9E9
| 172935 ||  || — || May 3, 2005 || Catalina || CSS || ADE || align=right | 3.7 km || 
|-id=936 bgcolor=#E9E9E9
| 172936 ||  || — || May 3, 2005 || Socorro || LINEAR || — || align=right | 1.8 km || 
|-id=937 bgcolor=#d6d6d6
| 172937 ||  || — || May 4, 2005 || Mount Lemmon || Mount Lemmon Survey || — || align=right | 5.0 km || 
|-id=938 bgcolor=#d6d6d6
| 172938 ||  || — || May 3, 2005 || Kitt Peak || Spacewatch || EOS || align=right | 2.9 km || 
|-id=939 bgcolor=#d6d6d6
| 172939 ||  || — || May 4, 2005 || Kitt Peak || Spacewatch || HYG || align=right | 5.5 km || 
|-id=940 bgcolor=#d6d6d6
| 172940 ||  || — || May 4, 2005 || Kitt Peak || Spacewatch || KOR || align=right | 2.0 km || 
|-id=941 bgcolor=#fefefe
| 172941 ||  || — || May 4, 2005 || Palomar || NEAT || NYS || align=right data-sort-value="0.82" | 820 m || 
|-id=942 bgcolor=#E9E9E9
| 172942 ||  || — || May 8, 2005 || Anderson Mesa || LONEOS || — || align=right | 2.6 km || 
|-id=943 bgcolor=#d6d6d6
| 172943 ||  || — || May 10, 2005 || Mount Lemmon || Mount Lemmon Survey || — || align=right | 4.3 km || 
|-id=944 bgcolor=#E9E9E9
| 172944 ||  || — || May 11, 2005 || Anderson Mesa || LONEOS || — || align=right | 4.3 km || 
|-id=945 bgcolor=#E9E9E9
| 172945 ||  || — || May 11, 2005 || Catalina || CSS || MAR || align=right | 1.7 km || 
|-id=946 bgcolor=#E9E9E9
| 172946 ||  || — || May 14, 2005 || Mount Lemmon || Mount Lemmon Survey || — || align=right | 3.1 km || 
|-id=947 bgcolor=#d6d6d6
| 172947 Baeyens ||  ||  || May 13, 2005 || Mount Lemmon || A. D. Grauer || — || align=right | 4.2 km || 
|-id=948 bgcolor=#E9E9E9
| 172948 ||  || — || May 10, 2005 || Socorro || LINEAR || — || align=right | 3.4 km || 
|-id=949 bgcolor=#d6d6d6
| 172949 ||  || — || May 11, 2005 || Palomar || NEAT || HYG || align=right | 4.7 km || 
|-id=950 bgcolor=#d6d6d6
| 172950 ||  || — || May 11, 2005 || Palomar || NEAT || EOS || align=right | 3.0 km || 
|-id=951 bgcolor=#fefefe
| 172951 Mehoke ||  ||  || May 11, 2005 || Cerro Tololo || M. W. Buie || V || align=right data-sort-value="0.96" | 960 m || 
|-id=952 bgcolor=#E9E9E9
| 172952 ||  || — || May 17, 2005 || Mount Lemmon || Mount Lemmon Survey || — || align=right | 4.2 km || 
|-id=953 bgcolor=#d6d6d6
| 172953 ||  || — || May 18, 2005 || Palomar || NEAT || K-2 || align=right | 2.0 km || 
|-id=954 bgcolor=#E9E9E9
| 172954 ||  || — || May 18, 2005 || Palomar || NEAT || — || align=right | 1.1 km || 
|-id=955 bgcolor=#d6d6d6
| 172955 ||  || — || May 30, 2005 || Siding Spring || SSS || TIR || align=right | 4.6 km || 
|-id=956 bgcolor=#E9E9E9
| 172956 ||  || — || June 1, 2005 || Kitt Peak || Spacewatch || — || align=right | 3.8 km || 
|-id=957 bgcolor=#d6d6d6
| 172957 ||  || — || June 1, 2005 || Mount Lemmon || Mount Lemmon Survey || — || align=right | 4.3 km || 
|-id=958 bgcolor=#d6d6d6
| 172958 ||  || — || June 3, 2005 || Kitt Peak || Spacewatch || — || align=right | 6.5 km || 
|-id=959 bgcolor=#d6d6d6
| 172959 ||  || — || June 8, 2005 || Kitt Peak || Spacewatch || — || align=right | 4.4 km || 
|-id=960 bgcolor=#E9E9E9
| 172960 ||  || — || June 11, 2005 || Kitt Peak || Spacewatch || — || align=right | 2.4 km || 
|-id=961 bgcolor=#d6d6d6
| 172961 ||  || — || June 16, 2005 || Mount Lemmon || Mount Lemmon Survey || — || align=right | 5.0 km || 
|-id=962 bgcolor=#d6d6d6
| 172962 ||  || — || June 28, 2005 || Kitt Peak || Spacewatch || EOS || align=right | 3.3 km || 
|-id=963 bgcolor=#d6d6d6
| 172963 ||  || — || June 29, 2005 || Palomar || NEAT || — || align=right | 5.9 km || 
|-id=964 bgcolor=#E9E9E9
| 172964 ||  || — || June 29, 2005 || Palomar || NEAT || AGN || align=right | 2.1 km || 
|-id=965 bgcolor=#d6d6d6
| 172965 ||  || — || June 30, 2005 || Kitt Peak || Spacewatch || 3:2 || align=right | 11 km || 
|-id=966 bgcolor=#d6d6d6
| 172966 ||  || — || June 23, 2005 || Palomar || NEAT || 3:2 || align=right | 7.3 km || 
|-id=967 bgcolor=#d6d6d6
| 172967 ||  || — || July 6, 2005 || Reedy Creek || J. Broughton || EOS || align=right | 3.9 km || 
|-id=968 bgcolor=#d6d6d6
| 172968 ||  || — || July 14, 2005 || Reedy Creek || J. Broughton || HYG || align=right | 5.0 km || 
|-id=969 bgcolor=#fefefe
| 172969 ||  || — || August 26, 2005 || Anderson Mesa || LONEOS || V || align=right | 1.2 km || 
|-id=970 bgcolor=#d6d6d6
| 172970 ||  || — || August 24, 2005 || Palomar || NEAT || — || align=right | 6.1 km || 
|-id=971 bgcolor=#d6d6d6
| 172971 ||  || — || August 31, 2005 || Campo Imperatore || CINEOS || — || align=right | 8.3 km || 
|-id=972 bgcolor=#d6d6d6
| 172972 ||  || — || September 24, 2005 || Kitt Peak || Spacewatch || — || align=right | 2.6 km || 
|-id=973 bgcolor=#d6d6d6
| 172973 ||  || — || September 28, 2005 || Palomar || NEAT || SYL7:4 || align=right | 7.6 km || 
|-id=974 bgcolor=#FFC2E0
| 172974 ||  || — || December 28, 2005 || Catalina || CSS || AMO || align=right data-sort-value="0.49" | 490 m || 
|-id=975 bgcolor=#fefefe
| 172975 ||  || — || February 20, 2006 || Catalina || CSS || FLO || align=right | 1.1 km || 
|-id=976 bgcolor=#fefefe
| 172976 ||  || — || February 27, 2006 || Kitt Peak || Spacewatch || PHO || align=right | 4.5 km || 
|-id=977 bgcolor=#fefefe
| 172977 ||  || — || February 27, 2006 || Kitt Peak || Spacewatch || — || align=right | 1.1 km || 
|-id=978 bgcolor=#fefefe
| 172978 ||  || — || April 18, 2006 || Kitt Peak || Spacewatch || — || align=right | 1.6 km || 
|-id=979 bgcolor=#fefefe
| 172979 ||  || — || April 20, 2006 || Kitt Peak || Spacewatch || — || align=right | 1.1 km || 
|-id=980 bgcolor=#E9E9E9
| 172980 ||  || — || April 20, 2006 || Kitt Peak || Spacewatch || — || align=right | 3.7 km || 
|-id=981 bgcolor=#fefefe
| 172981 ||  || — || April 21, 2006 || Catalina || CSS || — || align=right | 1.2 km || 
|-id=982 bgcolor=#fefefe
| 172982 ||  || — || April 28, 2006 || Socorro || LINEAR || FLO || align=right | 1.2 km || 
|-id=983 bgcolor=#fefefe
| 172983 ||  || — || April 25, 2006 || Kitt Peak || Spacewatch || — || align=right | 1.2 km || 
|-id=984 bgcolor=#E9E9E9
| 172984 ||  || — || April 20, 2006 || Socorro || LINEAR || — || align=right | 2.5 km || 
|-id=985 bgcolor=#fefefe
| 172985 Ericmelin ||  ||  || April 27, 2006 || Cerro Tololo || M. W. Buie || MAS || align=right data-sort-value="0.68" | 680 m || 
|-id=986 bgcolor=#fefefe
| 172986 ||  || — || May 4, 2006 || Kitt Peak || Spacewatch || NYS || align=right data-sort-value="0.67" | 670 m || 
|-id=987 bgcolor=#fefefe
| 172987 ||  || — || May 20, 2006 || Kitt Peak || Spacewatch || — || align=right | 1.0 km || 
|-id=988 bgcolor=#fefefe
| 172988 ||  || — || May 21, 2006 || Kitt Peak || Spacewatch || NYS || align=right | 1.2 km || 
|-id=989 bgcolor=#fefefe
| 172989 Xuliyang ||  ||  || May 25, 2006 || Lulin Observatory || Q.-z. Ye, H.-C. Lin || — || align=right | 1.00 km || 
|-id=990 bgcolor=#fefefe
| 172990 ||  || — || May 25, 2006 || Mount Lemmon || Mount Lemmon Survey || — || align=right | 1.5 km || 
|-id=991 bgcolor=#E9E9E9
| 172991 ||  || — || May 26, 2006 || Palomar || NEAT || CLO || align=right | 2.3 km || 
|-id=992 bgcolor=#fefefe
| 172992 ||  || — || May 29, 2006 || Kitt Peak || Spacewatch || FLO || align=right | 1.1 km || 
|-id=993 bgcolor=#E9E9E9
| 172993 ||  || — || May 30, 2006 || Kitt Peak || Spacewatch || — || align=right | 2.8 km || 
|-id=994 bgcolor=#d6d6d6
| 172994 ||  || — || May 24, 2006 || Palomar || NEAT || TIR || align=right | 5.2 km || 
|-id=995 bgcolor=#fefefe
| 172995 ||  || — || May 28, 2006 || Socorro || LINEAR || — || align=right | 1.5 km || 
|-id=996 bgcolor=#E9E9E9
| 172996 Stooke ||  ||  || May 25, 2006 || Mauna Kea || P. A. Wiegert || — || align=right | 2.4 km || 
|-id=997 bgcolor=#fefefe
| 172997 ||  || — || June 4, 2006 || Mount Lemmon || Mount Lemmon Survey || FLO || align=right | 1.0 km || 
|-id=998 bgcolor=#E9E9E9
| 172998 ||  || — || June 5, 2006 || Socorro || LINEAR || — || align=right | 1.5 km || 
|-id=999 bgcolor=#fefefe
| 172999 ||  || — || June 16, 2006 || Kitt Peak || Spacewatch || V || align=right data-sort-value="0.81" | 810 m || 
|-id=000 bgcolor=#fefefe
| 173000 ||  || — || June 16, 2006 || Palomar || NEAT || — || align=right | 1.6 km || 
|}

References

External links 
 Discovery Circumstances: Numbered Minor Planets (170001)–(175000) (IAU Minor Planet Center)

0172